

1801–15
  –
 Action of 19 February 1801 - British victory over France
 Battle of Aboukir 8 March – British-Turkish army under Sir Ralph Abernathy defeats French Army of Egypt under Jacques de Menou
 Battle of Mandora 13 March - The UK defeats France
 Battle of Alexandria 21 March - British victory over France
 Battle of Copenhagen 2 April – British commander Nelson defeats Danish fleet
 Action of 6 May 1801 - British victory over France
 Action of 24 June 1801 - French victory over the UK
 Siege of Cairo May - 27 June - The UK and the Ottoman Empire capture Cairo from France
 First Battle of Algeciras 6 July – British naval defeat by French
 Second Battle of Algeciras 12 July – British naval victory over French, Spanish
 Action of 1 August 1801 1 August - A US ship defeats Ottoman Tripolitania
 Raids on Boulogne 4-16 August - French victory over the UK
 Battle of Mahé 19 August - British victory over France
 Capitulation of Alexandria 30 August - France capitulates to the UK and the Ottoman Empire. End of the French campaign in Egypt and Syria
 Siege of Porto Ferrajo May - 1 October - France besieges Porto Ferrajo on the island of Elba, which was defended by Naples and Tuscany, aided by the UK. On 1 october peace in Europe made an end to the siege. France got Elba without further fighting, as a result of the peace treaty.
  – 
 Battle of Ravine-à-Couleuvres 23 February
 Battle of Crête-à-Pierrot 4–24 March
 First Battle of Tripoli Harbor 16 May
 First Battle of Sitka 20 June – Tlingit warriors massacre Russians and Aleut workers, and carry off the women and children.
 Battle of Poona - precursor to the Second Anglo-Maratha War
  –
 Blockade of Saint-Domingue 18 June – 6 December
 Action of 22 June 1803 22 June
 Battle of Delhi 11 September – British forces under Gerard Lake defeat Maratha forces led by French officer Louis Bourquin
 Siege of Aligarh 1–4 September

 Battle of Assaye 23 September – English under Wellesley defeat Marathas under Daulat Scindia in Deccan
 Siege of Port-au-Prince October
 Battle of Laswari 1 November – Lake defeats Marathas near Agra
 Battle of Vertières 18 November – Haitians defeat French in last battle of war of independence
 Battle of Argaon 28 November – Wellesley defeats Sindhia

 Second Ottoman invasion of Mani - Ottomans fail to conquer Mani a second time
  –
Battle of Ganja (1804) 22 November 1803 – 15 January 1804 – Russian victory in a battle between Russian Empire and Persian Empire for the control of Ganja citadel.
Castle Hill convict rebellion 5 March – Irish convict uprising in the New South Wales colony
Battle of Drlupa April - Serbia defeats the Dahije
Battle of Suriname 5 May – Battle between the Netherlands and Great Britain for the control of the Suriname colony. The UK captures Suriname.
Battle of Tabkin Kwatto 21 June - First decisive battle of Fulani War. The Sokoto Caliphate defeats Gobir.
Battle of Echmiadzin (1804) June – Russian forces forced to withdraw by Iranian forces during Russo-Persian War.
Second Battle of Tripoli Harbor 14 July – Indecisive battle between United States and Barbary Pirates.
Battle of Vizagapatam 15 September - French defeat British in Bay of Bengal
Second Battle of Sitka 1–7 October – In reprisal for the 1802 attack, Russian forces defeat the Tlingit in the last major armed conflict between Europeans and Alaska Natives.
Raid on Boulogne 2–3 October - Minor British victory over France
Action of 5 October 1804 - The British navy defeats Spain
Siege of Delhi 8-19 October - Brits and Mughals hold Delhi against the Marathas
Battle of Farrukhabad 17 November – Maratha forces of Jaswant Rao Holkar defeat British of commander Lake.
Action of 25 November 1804 - The British navy defeats Spain
Action of 7 December 1804 - The British navy defeats Spain
  –
Siege of Bharatpur (1805) 2 January – 22 February - The UK fails to capture Bharatpur, Rajasthan, capital of the Bharatpur State.
 Battle of Derne 27 April – 13 May – United States victory against Ottoman Tripolitania, during First Barbary War
 Battle of Diamond Rock 31 May - 2 June - France and Spain capture Diamond Rock from the UK
 Action of 15 July 1805 - French navy defeats the UK
 Battle of Blanc-Nez and Gris-Nez 18 July – A Batavian-French flotilla under Ver Huell repulses an attack by a superior British force
 Battle of Cape Finisterre 22 July - Inconclusive naval battle between the UK and a coalition of France and Spain.
 Action of 10 August 1805 - British navy defeats France
 Battle of Ivankovac 18 August – Serbian rebels defeated Ottoman army during the First Serbian Uprising
 Ulm Campaign 25 September – 20 October – Napoleonic Wars
 Battle of Donauwörth 7 October - France defeats Austria
 Battle of Wertingen 8 October - France defeats Austria
 Battle of Günzburg 9 October - France defeats Austria
 Battle of Haslach-Jungingen 11 October - France defeats Austria
 Battle of Memmingen 14 October - France defeats Austria
 Battle of Elchingen 14 October – French army, under Marshal Michel Ney, defeats an Austrian army
 Battle of Ulm 16–19 October – Napoleon forces surrender of Austrian army under Baron von Leiberich
 Battle of Verona (1805) 18 October - France defeats Austria
 Battle of Trafalgar 21 October – The UK under Horatio Nelson defeats France under Villeneuve, signals "England expects every man to do his duty", Nelson killed
 Battle of Caldiero 30 October – French forces under Masséna defeat Austrians in Italy under Archduke Charles of Austria
 Battle of Mehrnbach 30 October - France defeats Austria
 Battle of Lambach 31 October - France defeats Russia and Austria
 Battle of Cape Ortegal 4 November - The British navy defeats France
 Battle of Amstetten 5 November - Inconclusive battle between France and a coalition of Austria and Russia
 Battle of Mariazell 8 November - France defeats Austria
 Battle of Dürenstein 11 November - Inconclusive battle between France and a coalition of Russia and Austria
 Battle of Schöngrabern 16 November – Pyotr Bagration commands Russian and Austrian forces against Murat and Napoleon. French victory.
 Battle of Castelfranco Veneto 24 November - France defeats Austria
 Battle of Wischau 25 November - Russia defeats France
Battle of Austerlitz 2 December – French army, under Napoléon Bonaparte, win a great victory against Russian army and any Austrians troops. End of war of third coalition.
Siege of Santo Domingo - Haitians withdraw from French occupied Santo Domingo
  –
Battle of Blaauwberg 8 January – British beat the Dutch near Cape Town, this established British rule in South Africa.
 Battle of Campo Tenese 10 March - France defeats Naples
 Battle of Maida 4 July - The UK defeats France
 Siege of Gaeta 26 February - 18 July - France captures Gaeta from Naples.
Massacre of Lauria 7–8 August – French troops under Massena besiege and destroy Lauria, southern Italy. The citizens of Lauria were against the French occupation of the Kingdom of Naples.
Battle of Mišar 12–15 August – Serbs defeated bigger Ottoman army in Serbia, during First Serbian Uprising.
Action of 23 August 1806 - The British navy defeats Spain
Battle of Schleiz 9 October - France defeats Prussia and Saxony
Battle of Saalfeld 10 October - France defeats Prussia and Saxony
Battles of Jena and Auerstedt – 14 October – French army, under Davout and Napoleon, defeat two Prussian army in separate battles. The city of Berlin was taken by the French troops.
Battle of Halle 17 October - France defeats Prussia
Battle of Prenzlau 28 October - France defeats Prussia
Battle of Waren-Nossentin 1 November - Prussia defeats France
Battle of Lübeck 6 November - France defeats Prussia and Sweden
Battle of Czarnowo 23 December - France defeats Russia and Prussia
 Battle of Pułtusk 26 December – indecisive battle between Napoleon and Russians
Battle of Golymin 26 December - France defeats Russia
Battle of Deligrad December – big battle between Serbian rebels and Ottomans forces in which Serbs won.
 Edirne incident - standoff between Ottoman troops and Balkan janissaries
  –
Battle of Cardal 20 January - Britain defeats Spain
Battle of Mohrungen 25 January - French defeat Russians and Prussians.
Battle of Allenstein 3 February - France defeats Russia
Battle of Montevideo 3 February - The UK defeats Spain
Battle of Eylau 8 February – Napoleon fights a hard-won bloodbath with Russians, no decisive result.
Battle of Ostrołęka (1807) 16 February - French defeat Russians.
Dardanelles Operation 19 February - A failed British attempt against the coastal fortifications of the Ottoman capital of Constantinople.
Great Sortie of Stralsund 1-3 April - Sweden pushes the French army out of Swedish Pomerania.
Battle of the Dardanelles 10–11 May – Ottoman fleet fails to break the Russian blockade of Istanbul.
Siege of Danzig 19 March - 24 May - France captures Danzig, now Gdańsk from Prussia. Prussia was aided by Russia and the UK.
Battle of Mileto 28 May - France defeats Bourbon Naples and Sicily.
Action of 2 June 1807 - The Spanish navy defeats the UK
Battle of Guttstadt-Deppen 5-6 June - Russia defeats France
Battle of Heilsberg 10 June – Napoleon repulses Russian attack.
Battle of Friedland 14 June – French army, under Napoleon Bonaparte, decisively defeats Russians under Bennigsen. End of war of fourth coalition.
Battle of Arpachai 18 June - Russians defeat Ottomans.
Battle of Athos 19–29 June – Russian fleet under Admiral Seniavin defeats Ottoman fleet in Aegean.
Siege of Kolberg 20 March - 2 July - France besieged Prussian Kolberg, now Kołobrzeg until peace on 2 july. Prussia was aided by the UK and Sweden.
Battle of Miserere 2 July - British defeat Spanish.
Battle of the Retiro 5 July - British defeat Spanish
Siege of Stralsund 24 July - 24 August - France and Spain capture Stralsund from Sweden. This is the end of Swedish Pomerania.
Battle of Køge 29 August - British defeat Denmark-Norway
Second Battle of Copenhagen 2–7 September – British land, sea forces under Admiral Gambier and General Cathcart capture Danish fleet.
Alexandria expedition of 1807 18 March - 25 September - Failed British attempt to capture Alexandria. Viceroy Muhammad Ali Pasha accepts to formally keep Egypt within the Ottoman Empire.
Siege of Graudenz 22 January - 11 December - France fails to capture Graudenz, now Grudziądz from Prussia
Battle of Hingakaka - Largest battle ever fought on New Zealand soil. Tainui victory.
Third Ottoman invasion of Mani - Ottomans fail to capture Mani for a final time
  –
Battle of Zealand Point 22 March – Britain defeats Denmark-Norway.
Action of 4 April 1808 - The British navy defeats Spain
 Battle of Pyhäjoki 16 April - Russia defeats Sweden
 Battle of Lier 18 April - Sweden defeats Denmark-Norway
Battle of Siikajoki 18 April – Swedish commander Georg Carl von Döbeln halts Russian advance during Finnish War
 Battle of Toverud 19–20 April - Denmark-Norway defeats Sweden
 Battle of Rødenes 20 April – 7 May - Norwegians pushes the Swedish army out of Norway
 Battle of Trangen 25 April - Denmark-Norway defeats Sweden
Battle of Revolax 27 April – Swedish force defeats Russians camped in Finnish town
 Battle of Furuholm 28 April - Sweden defeats Denmark-Norway
Battle of Pulkkila 2 May – Swedish force annihilates Russian force in Finland
Battle of Kumlinge 9 or 10 May - Swedish peasants defeat a Russian army force
Battle of Kuopio 12 May - Sweden defeats Russia
Battle of Alvøen 16 May - Inconclusive naval battle between Denmark-Norway and the UK
 Battle of Mobekk 18 May - Sweden defeats Denmark-Norway
Battle of Valdepeñas 6 June - Inconclusive battle between France and Spain
Battle of Alcolea Bridge 7 June - France defeats Spain
Battle of Saltholm 9 June - The navy of Denmark-Norway defeats the UK
Battle of Prestebakke 10 June - Denmark-Norway defeats Sweden
Battle of Cabezón 12 June - France defeats Spain
Battle of El Bruc 6 and 14 June – French forces torch buildings after previous attempt foiled by ambush by Spain. Spanish victory.
Capture of the Rosily Squadron 9-14 June - Spain captures 6 French warships in the port of Cádiz
Battle of Lemo 19-20 June - Russia defeats Sweden
Battle of Girona 20 and 21 June - Spain defeats France
Battle of Nykarleby 24 June - Sweden defeats Russia
Battle of Vaasa 25-26 June - Russia defeats Sweden
Battle of Valencia 26-28 June - France fails to capture Valencia from Spain
Battle of Rimito Kramp 30 June - 2 July - Tactical victory, but strategic failure of the Swedish navy versus Russia
Battle of Lintulaks 3 July - Russia defeats Sweden
Battle of Kokonsaari 11 July - Russia defeats Sweden
Battle of Lapua 14 July – Swedish victory over Russia during Finnish War
Battle of Medina de Rioseco 14 July – French victory over Spain during Peninsular War
Battle of Bailén 16–19 July – French General Dupont surrenders to Spanish rebel forces
Battle of Évora 29 July - France defeats Portugal and Spain
 Battle of Sandöström 2–3 August - Russia defeats Sweden
Battle of Pälkjärvi 10 August - Sweden defeats Russia
Battle of Kauhajoki 10 August – Swedish commander Von Döbeln defeats the Russians
First Siege of Zaragoza 15 June – 13 August – Unsuccessful French attempt to capture Zaragoza, Spain
Siege of Girona 24 July - 16 August - France fails to capture Girona from Spain
Battle of Alavus 17 August - Sweden defeats Russia
Battle of Roliça 17 August – British-Portuguese victory over France during Peninsular War
Battle of Karstula 21 August - Russia defeats Sweden
Battle of Vimeiro 21 August – British, Portuguese forces under Arthur Wellesley defeat French under Junot
Battle of Nummijärvi 28 August - Sweden defeats Russia
Battle of Lappfjärd 29 August - Sweden defeats Russia
Battle of Grönvikssund 30 August - Swedish navy defeats Russia
Battle of Ruona-Salmi 1-2 September - Sweden defeats Russia at Ruona and Russia defeats Sweden at Salmi
Battle of Berby 12 September - Battle between Sweden and Denmark-Norway with a disputed outcome
Battle of Jutas 13 September – Swedes under von Döbeln intercept and defeat Russians
Battle of Oravais 14 September – Russian forces overwhelm Swedish army
Battle of Lokalaks 17-18 September - Russia defeats Sweden
Battle of Palva Sund 18 September - Russian navy defeats Sweden
Helsinki village landing 26-28 September - Russia defeats Sweden
Battle of Koljonvirta 27 October – Swedish victory over Russia following a month-long cease-fire
Battle of Zornoza 31 October – Indecisive battle between French and Spanish
Battle of Valmaseda 5 November – Minor Spanish victory over France
Battle of Burgos 10 November – French victory over Spain during Peninsular War
Battle of Espinosa de los Monteros 10–11 November – French victory, Spanish forces escape
Battle of Tudela 23 November – French marshal Jean Lannes defeats Spanish general Francisco Castaños during Peninsular War
Battle of Somosierra 30 November – French emperor Napoleon defeats Spanish commander Benito de San Juan.
 Battle of Cardedeu 16 December - France defeats Spain
 Battle of Molins de Rei 21 December - France defeats Spain
Battle of Sahagún 21 December – British cavalry defeat French cavalry during Peninsular War
 Battle of Benavente 29 December - The UK defeats France
Battle of Mansilla 30 December - France defeats Spain
  –
Battle of Castellón 1 January - Spain defeats France
Battle of Uclés 13 January - France defeats Spain
Battle of Quilon 15 January- British East India Company defeats the army of Travancore
Battle of Corunna 16 January – French defeat British commander Sir John Moore in Peninsular War
Siege of Zaragoza 19 December 1808 - 20 February 1809 - France captures Zaragoza from Spain.
Battle of Valls 25 February - France defeats Spain
Battle of Villafranca 17 March - Spain defeats France
Battle of Braga 20 March - France defeats Portugal
Battle of Miajadas 21 March - Spain defeats France
Battle of Los Yébenes 24 March - A Polish army of the French controlled Duchy of Warsaw successfully withdraws from a Spanish army
Battle of Ciudad Real 27 March – French forces under General Sabastiani defeat a Spanish army commanded by General Cartojal
First Battle of Porto 28 March – French forces under Marshal Soult capture the city of Porto from the Portuguese
 Battle of Medellín 28 March - France defeats Spain
Battle of Porto 29 March - France defeats Portugal and captures Porto
Battle of Sacile 16 April – French forces under Eugène de Beauharnais defeated in Italy by Austrians under Archduke John
Battle of the Basque Roads 18–24 April - British commanders Admiral Gambier and Thomas Cochrane defeat French Atlantic Fleet
Battle of Teugen-Hausen 19 April - France defeats Austria
Battle of Raszyn 19 April – Duchy of Warsaw defeats Austria.
Battle of Abensberg 19–20 April – Napoleon defeats Austrians in Germany under Archduke Charles
Battle of Landshut 21 April – French Marshal Masséna unable to destroy Austrian left wing under Johann Hiller
Battle of Eckmühl 22 April – French emperor Napoleon defeats Austrian Archduke Charles, forcing him to withdraw from Bavaria
Battle of Ratisbon 23 April – Austrian Archduke Charles makes good retreat in successful rearguard action against France
Battle of Neumarkt-Sankt Veit 24 April - Austria defeats France
Battle of Radzymin 25 April - Poles of the French controlled Duchy of Warsaw defeat Austria
Battle of Caldiero 27-30 April - Austria defeats France
Battle of Ebelsberg 3 May - France defeats Austria
Battle of Piave River 8 May - France defeats Austria
Battle of Grijó 10-11 May - The UK and Portugal defeat France
Second Battle of Porto 12 May – A coalition of the UK and Portugal under Wellesley defeats Marshal Soult, drives French from city
Battle of Wörgl 13 May - France defeats Austria
Battle of Alcantara (1809) 14 May - France defeats Portugal
Battle of Skellefteå 15 May - Russia defeats Sweden
Battle of Linz-Urfahr 17 May - France defeats Austria
Battle of Tarvis 15-18 May - France defeats Austria
Battle of Aspern-Essling 21–22 May – Napoleon's first attempt to cross Danube near Vienna results in serious check by Austrians under Archduke Charles
Battle of Alcañiz 23 May – Spanish defeat French
Battle of Sankt Michael 25 May - France defeats Austria
Battle of Stralsund (1809) 31 May - France defeats Prussia and Sweden
Battle of Puente Sanpayo 7-9 June - Spain defeats France
Battle of Suvodol 10 June - Serbia defeats the Ottoman Empire
Battle of Raab 14 June - France defeats Austria
Battle of María 15 June - France defeats Spain
Battle of Belchite (1809) 18 June - France defeats Spain
Battle of Graz 24–26 June - France defeats Austria
Battle of Nimla Late June-Early July - Mahmud Shah Durrani seizes the Durrani throne after winning a battle against Shah Shujah Durrani.
Battle of Hörnefors 5 July - Russia defeats Sweden
Battle of Wagram 5–6 July – French army, under Napoleon, defeats Austrians of Archduke Charles of Austria at great cost, ending war of fifth coalition
Battle of Gefrees 8 July - Austria and the Principality of Brunswick-Wolfenbüttel defeat France
Battle of Hollabrunn (1809) 9 July - Austria defeats France
Battle of Znaim 10-11 July - Battle between Austria and France ends with the arrival of Napoleon with news of an armistice
Battle of Talavera 27–28 July – The UK and Spain under Wellesley defeat forces of French Gen. Victor, King Joseph Bonaparte in Spain; made Viscount Wellington
Battle of Halberstadt 29–30 July - The Principality of Brunswick-Wolfenbüttel defeats the army of the French controlled Kingdom of Westphalia.
Battle of Ölper (1809) 1 August - Draw between the Principality of Brunswick-Wolfenbüttel and the Kingdom of Westphalia.
Battle of Arzobispo 8 August - France defeats Spain
Battle of Almonacid 11 August - France defeats Spain
Battle of Puerto de Baños 12 August - France defeats Portugal, Spain and the UK
Battle of Ratan and Sävar 17–22 August – Swedish General Wachtmeister defeats Russians near Umeå
Battle of Piteå 25 August - Russia defeats Sweden
Battle of Tamames 18 October – Spanish repel French Marhsal Ney's forces
Battles of Bergisel 12 April - 1 November - France and Bavaria defeat Tyrolean militia.
Battle of Ocaña 19 November – Spanish forces under Areizago crushed by French forces of King Joseph, Marshal Soult
Battle of Carpio 23 November - Spain defeats France
Battle of Alba de Tormes 26 November - France defeats Spain
Siege of Girona 6 May - 12 December - France captures Girona from Spain
Walcheren Campaign 30 July - 23 December - Unsuccesfull British invasion of French controlled Holland
  –
Battle of Mollet 21 January - Spain defeats France
Battle of Vic 20 February - France defeats Spain
Battle of Manresa 21 March - 5 April - Spain defeats France
Siege of Ciudad Rodrigo 26 April - 10 July - France captures Ciudad Rodrigo from Spain
Battle of Silda 23 July - The British navy defeats Denmark-Norway
Battle of Batin 17 August – Russians capture large Ottoman force during the Russo-Turkish War of 1810–1811
Battle of Grand Port 20–27 August – The French force the British Royal Navy fleet to surrender.
Battle of Batin 9 September - Russia defeats the Ottoman Empire
Battle of La Bisbal 14 September - Spain and the UK defeat France
Battle of Buçaco (or Busaco) 27 September – The UK and Portugal under Wellington repulses attacks from French commander Masséna, withdraws into Lines of Torres Vedras
Battle of Sobral 13–14 October - The UK and Portugal defeat France
Battle of Fuengirola 15 October – Polish in French service defeat British and Spanish during Peninsular War
Battle of Saguntum 25 October - France defeats Spain
Battle of Cotagaita 27 October - Spain defeats the United Provinces of the Río de la Plata
Battle of Monte de las Cruces 30 October - Early battle in Mexican War of Independence. Mexican insurgents defeat Spain.
Battle of Baza 4 November - France defeats Spain
Battle of Suipacha 7 November - The United Provinces of the Río de la Plata defeat Spain
Battle of Campichuelo 19 December 1810 – Revolutionary Argentinian forces defeats Spanish Royalist troops.
Battle of El Veladero - Mexicans defeat Spanish
  –
Battle of El Pla 15 January - Spain defeats France
Battle of Calderón Bridge 17 January – Spanish victory against a large Mexican force
Battle of Paraguarí 19 January – Revolutionary Argentinian forces are defeated by Spanish Royalist troops
Battle of the Gebora 19 February - France defeats Spain and Portugal
Battle of Barrosa 5 March – The Uk, Spain and Portugal defeat France
Battle of Tacuarí 9 March – Revolutionary Argentinian forces are defeated by Spanish Royalist troops
Battle of Pombal 11 March - France defeats the UK and Portugal
Battle of Redinha 12 March - Indecisive battle between France and a coalition of the UK and Portugal
Battle of Lissa 13 March – British fleet defeats French fleet
Battle of Foz de Arouce 15 March - The UK and Portugal defeat France
Battle of Campo Maior 25 March - The UK and Portugal defeat France
Battle of Anholt 27 March – British naval victory over Denmark and Norway
Battle of Khakeekera March - Bahraini-Kuwaiti victory against Saudi Diriyah forces.
Battle of Puerto de Piñones 1 April - Precursor to Battle of Zacatecas. Mexican rebels defeat Spain.
Battle of Sabugal 3 April – Anglo-Portuguese victory over French during Peninsular War
Battle of Zacatecas 15 April - Mexicans capture Zacatecas from Spain
Battle of El Maguey 2 May - Spain defeats Mexican rebels
Battle of Fuentes de Oñoro 5 May – Victory of the UK and Portugal under Wellington against the French under Masséna
Siege of Tarragona 5 May – 29 June – French victory against Spain on the east coast of Spain during the Peninsular War
Battle of Albuera 16 May – Draw of British, Portuguese and Spanish under Gen. Beresford and France under Marshal Soult
Battle of Arlabán 25 May - Spanish guerillas defeat France
Battle of Usagre 25 May - The UK, Portugal and Spain defeat France
Siege of Badajoz 22 April - 10 June - The UK and Portugal fail to capture Badajoz from France
Battle of Huaqui 20 June – Revolutionary Argentinian forces are defeated by Spanish Royalist troops
Battle of Cogorderos 23 June - Spain defeats France
Battle of Llanos de Santa Juana 12 July - Spanish victory, but the state Colima is later taken by the Mexicans.
Battle of Montserrat 25 July - France defeats Spain
Battle of Zújar 9 August - France defeats Spain
Siege of Figueras 4 April - 19 August - France captures Figueres from Spain.
Battle of El Bodón 25 September - British successfull rearguard action against France
Battle of Cervera 4-14 October - Spain defeats France
Battle of Saguntum 25 October - France defeats Spain
Battle of Arroyo dos Molinos 28 October – An allied force of the UK, Portugal and Spain under General Rowland Hill defeated a French force during Peninsular War
Battle of Bornos 5 November - Spain defeats France
Battle of Tippecanoe 7 November – William Henry Harrison (US) defeats Tecumseh and Shawnee
Battle of Yanbu end of 1811 – Muhammad Ali forces landed in Yanbu, winning a battle against the Saudis, starting Ottoman–Saudi War
  –
Siege of Tarifa 15 December 1811 – 5 January 1812 – Anglo-Spanish troops defeat the French during Peninsular War
 Battle of Altafulla 29 January - France defeats Spain
Battle of Al-Safra January – Forces of the Ottoman Empire under Muhammad Ali met Saudi Al-Kabeer forces near Medina. Saudi victory.
Siege of Ciudad Rodrigo 2–23 February – British and Portuguese forces besiege and defeat French garrison during Peninsular War.
Battle of Sultanabad 13 February - Persia defeats Russia
Battle of Izúcar 23 February - Mexican rebels defeat Spain
Battle of Badajoz 16 March – 6 April – British and Portuguese forces besiege and defeat French garrison during Peninsular War.
Battle of Arlabán 9 April - Spain defeats France
Battle of Villagarcia 11 April - The UK defeats France
Battle of Almaraz 18–19 May – Anglo-Portuguese Army under Lord Hill destroy a French pontoon bridge across the River Tagus during Peninsular War
Battle of Bornos 31 May - France defeats Spain
Battle of Maguilla 11 June - France defeats the UK, Portugal and Spain
Battle of Zitlala 4 July - Mexican rebels defeat Spain
Battle of Mir 9-10 July - Russia defeats the French controlled Duchy of Warsaw
Battle of Lyngør 12 July – British victory, Danish-Norwegian frigate sunk.
Battle of Ekau 19 July - France defeats Russia
First Battle of Sacket's Harbor 19 July – U.S. turns back British naval attack
Battle of Castalla 21 July - France defeats Spain
Battle of Salamanca 22 July – A coalition force of the UK, Portugal and Spain under Wellington defeats French under Marmont. French evacuate Madrid, but soon return
Battle of García Hernández 23 July - The UK defeats France
Battle of Saltanovka 23 July - France defeats Russia
Battle of Ostrovno 25 July - France defeats Russia
Batle of Vitebsk 26-27 July - France defeats Russia
Battle of Kobrin 27 July - Russia defeats the French vassal state of Saxony
Battle of Klyastitsy 30 July – 1 August – Minor Russian victory over French corps
Battle of Inkovo 8 August - Russia defeats France
Battle of Maguaga 9 August – Both armies, the USA and a coalition of the UK and Tecumseh's confederacy withdraw from War of 1812 battle 
Battle of Majadahonda 11 August - France defeats the UK and Portugal
Battle of Swolna 11 August - Inconclusive battle between Russia and France
Battle of Gorodechno 12 August - French controlled Austria and Saxony defeat Russia
First Battle of Krasnoi 14 August - France defeats Russia
Battle of Fort Dearborn 15 August – American Fort burned by the Potowatomi.
Siege of Detroit 15–16 August – American forces, under General William Hull, surrender to British, under Sir Isaac Brock and Chief Tecumseh during War of 1812
Battle of Smolensk 16–17 August – Russians under Pyotr Bagration, de Tolley defeated and retreat by France
First Battle of Polotsk 17–18 August – indecisive battle between Russian and French corps
Siege of Astorga 29 June - 19 August - Spain captures Astorga from France
Battle of Valutino 19 August – Marginal French victory; successful Russian retreat
Battle of Dahlenkirchen 22 August - France defeats Russia
Siege of Cádiz 5 February 1810 - 24 August 1812 - France fails to capture Cádiz from Spain
Siege of Fort Harrison 4–5 September – 10 healthy American soldiers repel attack by the Miami tribe, the Potowatomi, the Kickapoo people and the Ho-Chunk.
Battle of Shevardino 5 September - France defeats Russia
Siege of Fort Wayne 5–12 September – Americans repel Miamis and Potawatomis
Battle of Borodino 7 September – Russian commander Kutuzov retreats after bloody battle. Napoleon enters Moscow. General Pyotr Bagration is killed.
Battle of Burgos 19 September – 21 October – Unsuccessful siege by Anglo-Portuguese Army during Peninsular War. French victory.
Battle of Tucumán 24–25 September – Argentina's Army of the North, commanded by General Manuel Belgrano, defeated Spanish royalist troops
Battle of Mesoten 29 September - French controlled Prussia defeats Russia
Battle of Queenston Heights 13 October – U.S. forces under Rensselaer defeated in attempt to capture town by British under Sir Isaac Brock, who is killed
Battle of Tarutino 18 October – Russian victory over French commander Murat's corps
Second Battle of Polotsk 18–20 October – Russian victory over Saint-Cyr's Franco-Bavarian force.
Battle of Maloyaroslavets 24 October – Russians under Docturov defeat French, forcing northern retreat
USS United States vs HMS Macedonian 25 October – Decatur's USS United States captures British HMS Macedonian
Battle of Tordesillas 25-29 October - France defeats the UK, Portugal and Spain
Battle of Czasniki 31 October – Russians defeat French army, commanded by Marshal Victor.
Battle of Aslanduz 31 October – Russians defeat Persian army of Abbas Mirza.
Battle of Medina (1812) November – The Ottoman Empire under Muhammad Ali of Egypt recovers Medina from Saudis
Battle of Vyazma 3 November –  Russians defeat French indecisively
Battle of Liaskowa 9 November - Russia defeats France
Battle of Nowo Schwerschen 13 November - Russia defeats Lithuania and the Duchy of Warsaw, fighting for the French Empire
Battle of Smoliani 13–14 November – Russian victory over French forces of Victor and Oudinot
Battle of Wolkowisk 14-16 November - France defeats Russia
Battle of Kaidanowo 15 November - Russia defeats France
Battle of Krasnoi 15–18 November – Partial Russian victory. Napoleon drives off Russian forces attempting to block retreat. Heroism of Marshal Michel Ney
First Battle of Lacolle Mills 20 November – British and Mohawks defeat Americans
Battle of Borisov 21 November - Russia defeats France
Battle of Loschniza 23 November - France defeats Russia
Battle of Berezina 26–29 November – French successfully cross river with huge losses, despite being nearly surrounded by two Russian armies, ending retreat from Russia
Siege of Riga 24 July - 18 December - France fails to capture Riga from Russia
Battle of the Mississinewa 17–18 December – United States forces defeat Miami tribe.
Battle of Cerrito 31 December - The United Provinces of the Río de la Plata defeats Spain
  –
Battle of Jeddah 7 January – The Ottoman Empire under Tusun Pasha and his father are able to hold on Jeddah. But Jeddah is later captured by the Saudis.
 Battle of Frenchtown 22 January – British General Proctor with a combined British-Native American army defeats US Kentucky militia
 Battle of Mecca – The Ottoman Empire under Tusun Pasha and his father reclaim Mecca from the Saudis.
 Battle of Salta 20 February – The Argentina's Army of the North defeated for the second time the Spanish royalist troops of general Pío de Tristán
 Battle of Ogdensburg 22 February – British victory over the USA after attacking against orders
 Battle of San Lorenzo 3 February – Argentina defeats a Spanish Royalist force
 Battle of Rosillo Creek 29 March - Mexican rebels defeat Spain
 Battle of Möckern 5 April - Prussia and Russia defeat France
 Battle of Castalla 13 April - The UK, Spain and Sicily defeat France
 Battle of Mobile 15 April – US commander James Wilkinson captures Mobile from Spain
 Battle of La Chincúa 19 April – 28 May - Mexican rebels defeat Spain
Battle of York 27 April – US commanders Dearborn and Chauncey capture British garrison, recklessly loot and burn capital (now Toronto)
Battle of Yerbas Buenas 27 April - Spain defeats patriots from Chile
Battle of Lützen 2 May – Napoleon defeats Russo-Prussian army of Wittgenstein
Siege of Fort Meigs 1–9 May – Effective stalemate during War of 1812 between the USA and the UK
Battle of San Carlos (1813) 15 May - Chilean patriots defeat Spain
Battle of Bautzen 20–21 May – France under Napoleon defeats a coalition of Russia and Prussia under Wittgenstein, who is only able to escape due to Ney's incompetence
Battle of Haynau 26 May - Prussia defeats France
Battle of Fort George 27 May – US Lt. Col. Winfield Scott captures British fort
Second Battle of Sacket's Harbor 28–29 May – U.S. General Jacob Brown turns back British under Sir John Prevost
Battle of Boston Harbor 1 June – British HMS Shannon captures Lawrence's USS Chesapeake with ease
Siege of Tarragona 3–11 June – French victory in which an overwhelming Anglo-Allied force failed to capture the Spanish port
Battle of Luckau 4 June - Prussia and Russia defeat France
Battle of Stoney Creek 6 June – British force of 700 under John Vincent defeat US force three times its size under William Winder, John Chandler
Battle of San Millan-Osma 18 June - The UK, Portugal and Spain defeat France
Battle of Pequereque 19 June - The United Provinces of the Río de la Plata and the Republiquetas defeat Spain
Battle of Alazan Creek 20 June - The USA and Mexican rebels defeat Spain
Battle of Vitoria 21 June – The UK, Portugal and Spain under Wellington defeats French under Joseph, forced to withdraw towards France
Battle of Craney Island 22 June – British attack on US Norfolk foiled
Battle of Tolosa (1813) 26 June - The UK, Portugal and Spain defeat France
Battle of San Sebastian 7 July – 8 September – Allied forces of the UK and Portugal capture San Sebastián from French during Peninsular War.
Battle of Maya 25 July - Draw between France and a coalition of the UK and Portugal
Battle of Roncesvalles 25 July - France defeats the UK and Portugal
Battle of the Pyrenees 25–30 July – French large-scale attack under General Soult against the UK, Portugal and Spain fails during Peninsular War
Battle of Burnt Corn 27 July – American forces disperse a raiding party of Creek Indians
Battle of Sorauren 28 July – 1 August – The UK, Portugal and Spain under Wellington defeats France under Soult, who withdraws across Pyrenees
Battle of Fort Stephenson 2 August – British attack on American fort fails
Battle of St. Michaels 10 August – The UK under George Cockburn defeated by the USA
Battle of Medina 18 August - Spain defeats Mexican rebels and Americans
Battle of Großbeeren 23 August – Prussia, Russia and Sweden win series of three actions against France during War of the Sixth Coalition
Battle of Katzbach 26 August – Prussia and Russia under Von Blücher defeats France under Marshal MacDonald
Battle of Dresden 26–27 August – Napoleon's last major victory on German soil, over main Allied army of Austria, Russia and Prussia of Prince Schwarzenberg
Battle of Hagelberg 27 August - Prussia and Russia defeat France
Battle of Kulm 29–30 August – France under Marshal Vandamme defeated, captured by allied Coalition of Austria, Russia and Prussia
Battle of San Marcial 31 August – Spanish Army of Galicia, led by Manuel Freire, turns back France under Marshal Nicolas Soult's last major offensive of Peninsular War
Battle of Dennewitz 6 September – Prussia, Russia and Sweden under Bernadotte, Bülow defeat France under Ney
Battle of Feistritz 6 September - France defeats Austria
Battle of Lippa 7 September - Austria defeats France
Battle of Lake Erie 10 September – US Perry's fleet defeats British, Perry says "We have met the enemy and they are ours"
Battle of Ordal 13 September - The UK and Spain defeat France
Second Battle of Kulm 17 September – Allied Coalition of Austria, Prussia and Russia victory, Napoleon forced to halt his advance on Teplitz and withdraws to Leipzig
Battle of the Göhrde 18 September - Prussia, Russia and the UK defeat France
Battle of Altenburg 28 September - Prussia, Austria and Russia defeat France
Battle of Roßlau 29 September - Sweden defeats France
Battle of Vilcapugio 1 October – Republican forces of Argentina and Upper Peru (Bolivia) were defeated by a Spanish royalist army.
Battle of Wartenburg 3 October - Prussia defeats France
Battle of the Thames 5 October – U.S. troops under Harrison defeat British, Indians under Gen. Henry Proctor; Tecumseh killed
Battle of the Bidassoa 7 October - The UK, Portugal and Spain defeat France
Battle of El Roble 13 October - Chilean patriots defeat Spain
Battle of Leipzig 16–19 October – (Battle of the Nations) Napoleon suffers his greatest defeat ever in the largest battle of the Napoleonic Wars. Russia, Austria, Prussia, Sweden, Mecklenburg-Schwerin, Saxony and Württemberg defeat France
Battle of the Chateauguay 25 October – The UK with several hundred Canadian militia and the Mohawk people turn back Wade Hampton's advance on Montreal; the American army withdraws from Canada
Siege of Pamplona 26 June - 31 October - Spain and the UK capture Pamplona from France
Battle of Hanau 30–31 October – Austro-Bavarian army under Prince Wrede unable to cut off French retreat
Battle of Tallushatchee 3 November – U.S. forces under Andrew Jackson defeat Creek
Battle of Talladega 9 November – US commander Jackson defeats Creek
Battle of Nivelle 10 November – Allied troops of the UK, Portugal and Spain defeat Marshal Soult of France during Peninsular War
Battle of Crysler's Farm 11 November – US forces under James Wilkinson defeated by much smaller British force under J. W. Morrison
Battle of Ayohuma 14 November – Argentina's Army of the North and the Republiquetas were defeated by the Spanish royalists.
Battle of Caldiero 15 November - France defeats Austria
Battle of Autossee 29 November - The USA defeats the Red Stick Creeks
Battle of Arnhem (1813) 30 November - Prussia defeats France
Battle of Araure 5 December - Patriots of Venezuela defeat Spain
Battle of Bornhöved 7 December - Sweden defeats Denmark-Norway
Battle of Sehested 10 December - Denmark-Norway defeats Russia, Prussia, the UK, Hanover and the Duchy of Mecklenburg-Schwerin
Battle of the Nive 9–13 December – The UK, Portugal and Spain defeat Marshal Soult's French army near Bayonne during the Peninsular War
Battle of Lomas de Santa María 23–24 December - Spain defeats Mexican rebels
  –
Siege of Danzig 16 January 1813 - 2 January 1814 - Prussia and Russia capture Danzig, now Gdańsk from France
Siege of Cattaro 14 October 1813 - 3 January 1814 - The UK, Montenegro and Sicily capture Kotor from France
Battle of Puruarán 5 January - Spain defeats Mexican rebels
Siege of Torgau 18 October 1813 - 10 January 1814 - Prussia captures Torgau from France
Battle of Hoogstraten 11 January - Prussia, the UK and Russia defeat France
Battles of Emuckfaw and Enotachopo Creek 22–24 January – Twin indecisive battles during Creek War. The Red Stick Creeks versus the USA, the Lower Creeks and the Cherokee.
First Battle of Bar-sur-Aube 24 January - France withdrawal after a battle against Austria and the Kingdom of Württemberg
Battle of Calebee Creek 27 January - Stalemate between the USA and the Red Stick Creeks
Battle of Brienne 29 January – France under Napoleon defeats Prussia and Russia under Blücher
Battle of La Rothière 1 February – French under Napoleon manage to hold back an overwhelming force of Prussians until nightfall, where then they withdraw from the field.
Battle of Lesmont 2 February - France defeats Bavaria and Russia
Battle of the Mincio River 8 February - Inconclusive battle between France and Austria
Battle of Champaubert 10 February – France under Napoleon defeats Russia
Battle of Montmirail 11 February – France under Napoleon defeats Russia and Prussia
Battle of Château-Thierry 12 February – France under Napoleon defeats Prussia and Russia
Battle of Vauchamps 14 February – France under Napoleon defeats Prussia and Russia
Battle of Garris 15 February - The UK, Portugal and Spain defeat France
Battle of Mormant 17 February - France defeats Austria, Bavaria and Russia
Battle of Montereau 18 February – France under Napoleon defeats Austria and Württemberg
Battle of Bar-sur-Aube 27 February – Austria, Bavaria and Russia under Schwarzenberg defeats France under Marshal Macdonald
Battle of Orthez 27 February – The UK, Portugal and Spain under Wellington defeats French under Soult near Bayonne
Battle of Gué-à-Tresmes 28 February - France defeats Prussia and Russia
Battle of Cúcuta 28 February - The United Provinces of New Granada defeat Spain
Battle of Saint-Julien (1814) 1 March - Austria defeats France
Battle of Laubressel 3 March - Austria, Bavaria, Russia and Württemberg defeat France
Battle of Longwoods 4 March – American victory during War of 1812 against the UK, the Wyandot people and the Potowatomi
Battle of Craonne 7 March – France under Napoleon defeats Prussia and Russia under Blücher
Battle of Laon 9–10 March – Prussia and Russia under Blücher defeats France under Napoleon
Battle of Mâcon 11 March - Austria defeats France
Battle of Reims 13 March – France under Napoleon defeats isolated Russian and Prussian corps
Battle of El Quilo 19 March - Chilean patriots defeat Spain
Battle of Limonest 20 March - Austria and the Grand Duchy of Hesse defeat France
Battle of Membrillar 20 March - Chilean patriots defeat Spain
Battle of Arcis-sur-Aube 20–21 March – Austria, Bavaria, Russia and Württemberg under Schwarzenberg defeats France under Napoleon
Battle of Fère-Champenoise 25 March – Austria, Prussia, Russia and Württemberg under Schwarzenberg defeats French corps of Marmont, Mortier
Battle of Saint-Dizier 26 March - France defeats Russia
Battle of Horseshoe Bend 27 March – The USA, Lower Creeks, Cherokee and Choctaw under Jackson decisively defeats Red Stick Creeks
Battle of Montmartre 30 March – Allied forces of Russia, Austria and Prussia enter Paris, force surrender of France under Marmont, Mortier.  Napoleon abdicates soon after; goes to Elba
Second Battle of Lacolle Mills 30 March – U.S. forces under Wilkinson defeated by British in attempt to invade Canada via Niagara.  Wilkinson relieved, replaced by Jacob Brown, with assistance of Winfield Scott
Battle of Courtrai 31 March - France defeats Saxony and Prussia
Battle of Toulouse 10 April – The UK, Portugal and Spain under Wellington defeat France under Soult, forced to abandon city.  Fighting on southern front comes to end soon after, with news of Napoleon's abdication
Siege of Metz 3 January - 10 April - Prussia, Russia and the Electorate of Hesse fail to capture Metz from France
Battle of Bayonne 14 April - The UK, Portugal and Spain defeat France
Siege of Antwerp 14 January - 4 May - The UK and Prussia besieged Antwerp. French commander surrenders after news of the abdication of Napoleon.
Siege of Mainz 3 January - 4 May - Russia, the Duchy of Berg and the Duchy of Nassau besiege Mainz. French commander surrenders after news of the abdication of Napoleon.
Siege of Hamburg 24 December 1813 - 12 May 1814 - Russian siege of Hamburg. The French commander surrendered on 27 may, on orders of the new king of France.
Siege of Naarden 17 November 1813 - 12 May 1814 - The Netherlands and Russia besieged Naarden. French garrison surrenders after news that the war was over.
Battle of Alto de los Godos 25 May - Patriots from Venezuela defeat Spain
Battle of Big Sandy Creek 30 May – U.S. forces surprise the British in upstate New York, capturing 6 ships and 143 prisoners
Battle of Niquitao 2 July - Patriots from Venezuela defeat Spain
Battle of Chippawa 5 July – U.S. forces invade Canada under Brown, Scott defeats British under Phineas Riall
Battle of Los Horcones 22 July - Patriots from Venezuela defeat Spain
Battle of Lundy's Lane 25 July – Brown's Americans take on British under Sir Gordon Drummond in violent indecisive battle. US forces withdraw from Canada due to heavy losses giving argument for British victory.
Battle of Mackinac Island 26 July – 4 August – Unsuccessful American attempt to capture the British Fort Mackinac.
Battle of Taguanes 31 July - Venezuelan patriots and the United Provinces of New Granada defeat Spain
Battle of Lier 2 August - Norway defeats Sweden
Battle of Matrand 5 August - Norway defeats Sweden
Battle of Rakkestad 6 August - Sweden defeats Norway
Battle of Langnes 9 August - Disputed outcome of a battle between Norway and Sweden
Battle of Kjølberg Bridge 14 August - Sweden defeats Norway
Battle of Bladensburg 24 August – British forces rout Americans in Maryland, battle witnessed by President Madison. British move on to burn Washington in retribution for the burning of York (Toronto). American government barely escapes the city as Congress and the Whitehouse are torched.
Battle of Lake Champlain and Battle of Plattsburgh 11 September – U.S. squadron under Thomas Macdonough defeats British under George Downie.  Same day, U.S. land forces under Prevost fight indecisive battle with Americans under Alexander Macomb
Battle of North Point 12 September – Land Battle between the USA and the UK, complement of Battle for Ft. McHenry (part of the Battle of Baltimore). Americans retreat after inflicting heavy casualties on the British.
Battle of Ft. McHenry 13 September – American fort protecting Baltimore harbor holds out against British bombardment, inspiring Francis Scott Key's "Star Spangled Banner" (part of the Battle of Baltimore).
Battle of Cook's Mills 19 October – Indecisive battle between the USA and the UK in Canada during War of 1812
Siege of Fort Erie 4 August – 5 November – Americans repel British attempt to retake fort
Battle of Pensacola 7–9 November – US commander Andrew Jackson wins Pyrrhic victory against the UK, Spain and the Creeks.
Battle of Urica 5 December - Spain defeats Venezuela
  –
Battle of New Orleans 8 January – Jackson defeats British Army of Pakenham, as news of Treaty of Ghent signed in December, not yet arrived
 Battle of Fort Bowyer 11 February – Jackson loses fort after boasting that ten thousand men could not take it.
Battle of the Panaro 3 April
Battle of Occhiobello 8–9 April
Battle of Carpi (1815) 10 April
Battle of Cesenatico 23 April
Battle of Pesaro 28 April
Battle of Scapezzano 1 May
Battle of Tolentino 2 May – Joachim Murat, King of Naples, declares for Napoleon in Hundred Days, defeated by Austrians, forced to flee kingdom.
Battle of Ljubić 8 May
Battle of Castel di Sangro 13 May
Battle of San Germano 15–17 May
Battle of the Sink Hole 24 May
Battle of Quatre Bras 16 June – Ney fights indecisive battle against Wellington.
Battle of Ligny 16 June – Napoleon defeats Prussians under Blücher.
Battle of Waterloo 18 June – Emperor Napoleon defeated by Duke of Wellington and Prussians, Dutch and German forces.
Battle of Wavre 18 June – Marshal Grouchy, assigned to prevent Blücher from joining Wellington, fights mildly successful battle against Blücher's rearguard
Battle of Rocheserviere 20 June
Battle of La Suffel 28 June
Battle of Temalaca 5 November

1816–60
 1816 –
Battle of Seven Oaks 19 June
 Bombardment of Algiers 27 August – UK and Dutch ships attack Barbary pirates.
 Battle of Yavi 15 November
 Battle of Pablo Perez 6 December
 1817 –
Battle of Chacabuco 12 February – Chilean rebels defeat Spanish.
 Battle of Curapalihue 4 April
 Battle of la Tablada de Tolomosa 15 April
Nejd Expedition 1817-1818 – Ibrahim Pasha captured several Nejdi villages
Battle of Mahidpur 21 December – British forces under Sir Thomas Hyslop defeat Marathas under Holkar
Battle of Makassar - Argentine skirmish.
Battle of Khadki - British capture Pune
 1818 –
 Battle of Kafir Qala – The Afghans defeat a Persian army on its way to take Herat.
 Second Battle of Cancha Rayada 16 March – Spanish forces defeat Chileans under San Martin.
 Battle of Maipú 5 April – Chile free from Spain
 Nejd Expedition – Ibrahim Pasha captured Riyadh
 Battle of Diriyah 9 September – Ibrahim Pasha captured and destroyed Diriyah ending the First Saudi State
 Battle of Koregaon - Unresolved 
 1819 –
Battle of Las Queseras del Medio 2 April
Battle of Grahamstown 22 April – Xhosa chief Makana attacks the British settlement of Grahamstown in Eastern Cape, South Africa with 6000 men and is repulsed with heavy losses.
Battle of Vargas Swamp 25 July
Battle of Boyacá 7 August – Known in Colombia as Battle of Boyacá Bridge. (Batalla del puente de Boyacá) Simón Bolívar and his brigadier generals Francisco de Paula Santander and Jose Antonio Anzoátegui defeat and capture royalist Colonel Jose Maria Barreiro in the battle sealing the independence of Nueva Granada, now Colombia.
Battle of Agua Zarca 5 November
 Battle of Píleo 7 December
 1820 –
 Battle of Valdivia 3–4 February – Thomas Cochrane and Jorge Beauchef capture the Royalist stronghold of Valdivia for Chile.
 Battle of Agüi 18 February
 Battle of El Toro 6 March
 Battle of Tarpellanca 26 September
 Martin Rodriguez campaigns - Argentine Martin Rodriguez sets out to battle indigenous peoples of Buenos Aires Province.
 1821 –
Battle of Rieti 7 March – Austrian forces defeat Neapolitan rebels against King Ferdinand
Battle of Novara 8 April – Austrian and Sardinian troops defeat Piedmontese revolutionaries
Battle of Alamana 22 April
Battle of Gravia Inn 8 May
Battle of Doliana 18 May
Battle of Valtetsi 24 May
Battle of Dragashani 19 June
Battle of Carabobo 24 June – Simón Bolívar defeats Spanish army, ensuring Venezuelan independence.
Battle of Sculeni 29 June
Battle of Menangkabaoe – Part of the first Padri War in the Dutch East Indies. Colonial Dutch forces defeated Indonesian rebels.
Battle of Azcapotzalco 19 August
Battle of Rincon de Marlopa - battle between Tucumán and the provinces of Salta and Santiago del Estero. 
 1822 –
 Battle of Pichincha 24 May – Sucre defeats Spaniards near Quito
 18 – 19 June – Greek rebel Konstantinos Kanaris burns the flagship of the Ottoman fleet
 Battle at Dervenakia 26–28 July (O.S.) – Greek revolutionaries under Theodoros Kolokotronis, Papaflessas and Nikitaras crush Dramali Pasha's Ottoman army.
 Battle of Karpenizi 8 August (O.S.) – Greek troops under Marco Bozzaris defeat Ottoman force under Mustai Pasha heading to reinforce Ottoman troops besieging Missolonghi
 1823 –
Battle of Trocadero – French army, under Duke of Angoulême, defeat Spanish army and takes Trocadero. Occupation of Spain by French troops (1823 at 1828)
 Battle of Zepita 25 August
 Demerara rebellion - 10,000 Guyanese slaves rise up for two days.
 Battle of Nowshera - Sikhs take Peshawar valley
 1824 
 Battle of Nsamankow 21 January
 Battle of Mocopulli 1 April
 Battle of Ramu 16 May – Burmese forces under Lord Myawaddy defeat British under Captain Norton, who is killed
 Battle of Junín 6 August
 Battle of Ayacucho 9 December
 1825 –
 Battle of Danubyu 2 April – British forces under Sir Archibald Campbell defeat Burmese under Maha Bandula, who is killed
 Battle of Prome 30 November – 2 December – Campbell defeats Burmese, led by Maha Nenyo, who is killed
 1826 Battle of Ganja – Russia defeats Persian invaders
 1827 –
  Battle of Berbera 10-11 Jan
 Battle of Monte Santiago – A naval division of the Brazilian Imperial Navy is attacked by Argentine vessels. The battle ended with the destruction of the attacking forces.
 Battle of Ituzaingó or Passo do Rosário 27 February – A Brazilian Army under Marquis of Barbacena met in combat an Argentine/Uruguayan Army led by General Carlos Maria Alvear (part of the Cisplatine War).
 Battle of Phaleron 24 April (O.S.) – Greek setback in the Greek War of Independence
 Battle of Navarino 20 October – Joint British, French, Russian fleets, under Admirals Codrington, Rigny, and Heiden, destroy Turko-Egyptian fleet of Tahir Pasha inside Navarino Bay.
 Battle of Kossober October – Ethiopian warlord Yimam of Yejju joins with Wube Haile Mariam of Semien to defeat Goshu Zewde of Gojjam and Meru of Dembiya.
 1828
 Battle of Mariel 10–11 February – Spanish navy defeats and captures a Mexican brig
 Battle of Akhalzic 9 August – Russian troops under Paskievich defeat Ottoman troops in Caucasus
 Battle of Praia Bay 28 August – Miguelite fleet in Portugal defeated by loyalists of Queen Maria in Azores
 1829
Battle of San Roque 22 April
Battle of Márquez Bridge 26 April
Battle of Kulevicha 11 June – Russian troops under Hans Karl von Diebitsch defeat Ottoman Army under Reshid Pasha in Balkans
Battle of Tampico 11 September – Mexican army defeats a Spanish incursion near the city of Tampico
 1830 Siege of Yogyakarta – Part of the Java War Fought between Indonesian rebels, and the Dutch colonial army. The Dutch won after 5 years of fighting.
 1831 –
Battle of Debre Abbay 14 February – Ras Marye of Yejju marches into Tigray and defeats and kills Dejazmach Sabagadis.
 Battle of Stoczek 14 February – Polish victory during November Uprising.
 Battle of Białołęka 24 February – Polish counterattack succeeds, forcing Russian attack to be moved up one day.
 Battle of Olszynka Grochowska 25 February – Marginal Polish victory during November Uprising.
 Battle of Iganie 8 March – Poland defeats Russia.
 Battle of Ostrołęka 26 May – Russians under Diebitsch fight indecisive battle against Poles of Jan Skrzynecki
 Ten days campaign 2–12 August – Dutch military victory in the Belgian Revolution. Dutch led by Prince William
Battle of Ladeira da Velha 3 August
Battle of Hasselt 8 August – Dutch army defeated Belgian rebels. The Rebels suffered 700 dead while the Dutch losses were very small.
Battle of Leuven 12 August – The Dutch army defeated the Belgian rebels and took the city.
Battle of Warsaw 6–8 September – Russians under Paskievich defeat Poles under Dembinski and stamp out revolt
Battle of the Tagus - French attempt to strongarm the Portuguese government into recognizing the Kingdom of France.
First Battle of Wawer - Polish victory
Battle of Nowa Wieś - Polish victory after being outnumbered by Russians
Second Battle of Wawer - Second Polish victory in that town
Battle of Dębe Wielkie - Polish victory near Warsaw
Battle of Poryck - Polish victory
Battle of Rajgród - second to last Polish victory
 1832 –
 Indian Creek Massacre 20 May – Settlers killed by Indians in Illinois.
 Battle of the Kellogg's Grove 16 July – U.S. forces defeat Sauk.
Battle of Ponte Ferreira 22–23 July
 Battle of Bad Axe 2 August – Illinois militia massacres Black Hawk's Saux and Fox
 Siege of Antwerp 15 November – Dutch troops occupying Antwerp's citadel (led by David Chassé) against France's Armée du Nord.
 Battle of Konya 21 December – Egyptian forces under Ibrahim Pasha defeat main Ottoman Army of Reshid Pasha in Anatolia
 Verovering van Bondjol – Dutch army successfully beats down an uprise by the people of Sumatra
 1833 
Battle of Cape St. Vincent 5 July – British fleet under Sir Charles Napier defeats fleet of Portuguese usurper Don Miguel
Battle of Cova da Piedade 23 July
 1834 
Battle of Alsasua 22 April
Battle of Santarén 16 May – Portuguese forces loyal to Queen Maria II (led by her father, Don Pedro) defeat forces of usurper Don Miguel
Battle of Aranzueque 19 September
Battle of Venta de Echavarri 28 October
First Battle of Arquijas 15 December
Battle of Peshawar - Sikhs take Peshawar
 1835 –
Battle of Macta 28 June
Battle of Mendigorría 16 July
Battle of Gonzales 2 October – Mexicans withdraw during Texas Revolution.
Battle of Goliad 10 October
Battle of Concepción 28 October – Texans defeat Mexicans under Martin Perfecto de Cós.
Grass Fight 26 November – Texans, thinking a Mexican pack train is carrying silver, capture it but only end up with grass.
Siege of Bexar 12 October – 11 December Texans successfully besiege and defeat Mexicans.
Dade Battle 25 December – 108 American troops were ambushed by about 180 Seminole Indians. Colonel Dade, who was on horseback, was the first to be killed. Only three American purportedly survived the attack. Two of these survivors died shortly after.
 1836 –
Battle of San Patricio 27 February – Texan expedition into Mexico thwarted.
 Battle of the Alamo 23 February – 6 March – General Santa Anna defeats Texans. Wm. Travis and Davy Crockett killed in siege.
 Battle of San Patricio 27 February
 Battle of Agua Dulce Creek 2 March
Battle of Refugio 12–15 March – Infighting amongst Texans leads to defeat.
Battle of Coleto 19–20 March – Col. James Fannin and Texans defeated and captured by Mexicans of General Jose de Urrea. Later massacred by Santa Anna.
Battle of San Jacinto 21 April – Texans capture Santa Anna.
Battle of Terapegui 26 April – Spanish constitutionalist forces loyal to Queen Isabella, supported by French Foreign Legion, defeat Carlists near Pamplona.
Battle of San Felasco Hammock 18 September
Battle of Villarrobledo 20 September
Battle of Wahoo Swamp 21 November – December
Battle of Majaceite 23 November
 1837 –
Battle of Huesca 24 March – Constitutionalists win decisive victory over Carlists in Spain.
Battle of Villar de los Navarros 24 August
Battle of Saint-Denis 23 November – Canadian rebels under Wolfred Nelson defeat British.
Battle of Saint-Charles 25 November – British defeat Canadian rebels.
Confrontation at Montgomery's Tavern 7 December – Battle near tavern first action of Upper Canada Rebellion.
Battle of Saint-Eustache 14 December – British capture and ransack village.
Battle of Lake Okeechobee 25 December – US forces under Zachary Taylor defeat Seminoles.
Siege of Herat - Afghan victory against Qajar dynasty.
Siege of Constantine - French victory subduing the city of Constantine, Algeria.
Battle of Jamrud - Disputed results
 1838 –
Battle of Pelee Island 3 March
Battle of Pine Island Ridge 22 March
Battle of Italeni 9 April
Battle of Maella 1 October
Battle of Beauharnois 10 November – Revolt in Canada put down.
Battle of the Windmill 12–16 November – British forces defeat Canadian rebels.
Battle of Windsor 4 December
Battle of Blood River 16 December – Voortrekker force under Andries Pretorius defeat Zulu force under King Dingane in Natal
French blockade of the Rio de la Plata - Two year long blockade on the new Argentine Republic,
 1839 
Battle of Buin 6 January
Battle of Casma 12 January
Battle of Yungay 20 January
Battle of Ramales 12 May
Battle of the San Gabriels 17 May
Battle of Nezib 24 June – Egyptian forces under Ibrahim Pasha defeat Ottoman Army under Hafiz Pasha (assisted by Prussian Captain Helmuth von Moltke)
Battle of the Neches 15–16 July
Battle of Kowloon 3 September
First Battle of Chuenpi 3 November
Battle of Ghazni - Brits capture Ghazni
 1840 
Battle of Magango 29 January – Boer forces defeat Zulu King Dingane
Battle of Plum Creek 12 August
Battle of the Barrier 19 August
Battle of Saltillo 25 October
Battle of Quebracho Herrado 28 November
Battle of Mazagran - French army holds up against an attack by Algerian forces, and was popularized in French contemporary media.
 1841 
Second Battle of Chuenpi 7 January
Battle of First Bar 27 February
Battle of Whampoa 2 March
Battle of Drummond's Island 9 April
Battle of Canton 24 May – British amphibious assault captures city.
Battle of Angaco 16 August
Battle of Amoy 26 August
Battle of Famaillá 19 September
Battle of Rodeo del Medio 24 September
Battle of Chinhai 10 October
 1842 –
Battle of Kabul 6 January – Afghan forces force British to withdraw from city, which they had occupied for two and a half years
Battle of Debre Tabor 7 February – Ras Ali Alula, Regent of the Emperor of Ethiopia defeats warlord Wube Haile Maryam of Semien.
Battle of Ningpo 10 March
Battle of Woosung 16 June
Battle of Chinkiang 21 July
Battle of Arroyo Grande 6 December
Costa Brava Combat - Battle between Argentina and the Uruguayan colorados.
Battle of Jellalabad - Brits capture Jalalabad
 1843 –
 Battle of the Smala 16 May – French forces under Duc d'Aumale defeat Algerians under Abd el Kader
 Battle of Miani 17 February –  British forces under Sir Charles Napier defeat the Baluch forces of the Talpurs in Sind
 Battle of Hyderabad March – Napier defeats Baluchis in Sindh
 Great Siege of Montevideo - 7 year long siege during the Uruguayan Civil War.
 1844 –
 Battle of Fuente del Rodeo 13 March
 Battle of Cabeza de Las Marías 13–18 March
 Battle of Azua 19 March
 Battle of Santiago (1844) 30 March
 Battle of El Memiso 13 April
 Battle of Tortuguero 15 April
 Battle of Isly 14 August – French forces under Marshal Bugeaud rout Moroccan forces
 Battle of Fort Cachimán 6 December
 Bombardment of Tangiers - The first bombardment in a slew of attacks by the French navy during the Franco-Moroccan War.
 Bombardment of Mogador - The third bombardment in the series aforementioned (the second was Isly).
 1845 –
Battle of Ohaeawai July – British Army attacks Māori Pa, but fortifications too strong
Battle of Estrella 17 September
Battle of Sidi Brahim 22–25 September
Battle of Beler 27 November
Battle of Mudki 18 December – Sikh forces invading British India defeated by force under Sir Hugh Gough
Battle of Ferozeshah 21–22 December – British forces under Gough and Hardinge, Governor-General, defeat Sikhs under Lal Singh in hard-fought battle
Battle of Vuelta de Obligado - battle during the Anglo-French blockade of the Río de la Plata during the Argentine and Uruguayan wars.
 1846 –
 Battle of Aliwal 28 January – Sikh forces under Runjoor Singh defeated by British under Sir Harry Smith
 Battle of Sobraon 10 February – British forces under Gough decisively defeat Sikhs, and Punjab becomes British protectorate
 Siege of Fort Texas 3–9 May – Mexican siege on U.S. fort unsuccessful
 Battle of Palo Alto 8 May – U.S. General Zachary Taylor defeats Mexicans under Mariano Arista
 Battle of Resaca de la Palma 9 May – Taylor attacks Arista's retreating Mexicans
 Siege of Los Angeles 13 August – U.S. Marines briefly capture Los Angeles, but are driven out by Californio forces, led by José María Flores.
 Battle of Santa Fe 15 August Kearney occupies Santa Fe
 Battle of Monterrey 20–24 September – Mexicans under Pedro de Ampudia defeated by Taylor's US forces in hard-fought battle
 Battle of Dominguez Rancho – 9 October José Antonio Carrillo leads Californio forces in victory against 350 US Marines and sailors near Los Angeles.
 First Battle of Tabasco 24–26 October – Commodore Matthew C. Perry fights inconclusive battle with Mexicans under Juan B. Traconis.
 Battle of San Pasqual 6 December – U.S. Cavalry General Stephen Kearny's dragoons are defeated by Californio forces, led by Andrés Pico near San Diego.
Battle of San Lorenzo - Argentine victory during the Anglo-French blockade of the Río de la Plata.
Battle of Quebracho - Argentine victory during the Anglo-French blockade of the Río de la Plata.
Battle of Gdów - Austrians defeat Polish insurgents
 1847 –
 Battle of Rio San Gabriel 8 January – Kearny's 600-man army defeats the 160-man Californio force near Los Angeles.
 Battle of La Mesa 9 January – Kearny, Stockton and Fremont's combined US forces, defeat the Californio's in the climactic battle for California.
 Battle of the Sacramento 28 February – U.S. forces under Alexander Doniphan defeat Mexican force near Chihuahua
 Battle of Buena Vista 22–23 February – Taylor's outnumbered men trounce Santa Anna's Mexicans
 Battle of Vera Cruz 9–29 March – Scott takes port city
 Battle of Cerro Gordo 18 April – Scott defeats Santa Anna
 Battle of Tuxpan 18 April – Perry defeats Cos
 Second Battle of Tabasco 15–16 June – Commodore Perry captures
 Battle of Contreras 19–20 August – Scott's forces storm Mexican position defending Mexico City
 Battle of Churubusco 20 August – Another U.S. force storms other main Mexican position defending capital
 Battle of Molino del Rey 8 September – Scott defeats Mexican force defending fortification in hard-fought battle
 Battle of Chapultepec 12 September – Scott takes fortified hill by storm in climactic battle of war
 Siege of Puebla 14 September – 12 October – Puebla taken by Winfield Scott
 Battle of Huamantla 9 October – U.S. victory, end of Santa Anna's military career
 Bombardment of Tourane - French forces attack Da Nang after the Vietnamese hold two French priests captive.
 1848 –
 Battle of Dabarki March – Dejazmach Kassa assaults an Egyptian fortified camp deep inside of Sudan and suffers massive losses. One of the few defeats experienced by the future Emperor.
 Battle of Custoza 24–25 July – Austrian forces under Marshal Radetzky defeat Sardinians under King Charles Albert
 Battle of Boomplaats 29 August – British forces under Sir Harry Smith defeat Boers under Pretorius in Orange River area
 Battle of Pákozd 29 September – Hungarian forces defeat Austrian army of Count Jellachich
 Battle of Schwechat 30 October – Hungary
 Battle of Ramnagar 22 November – British forces under Gough repulsed by Sikhs under Shere Singh in Punjab
 Battle of Mór 30 December – Hungary, Alfred I, Prince of Windisch-Grätz defeats a Hungarian detachment under Mór Perczel
 Battle of Miłosław - Polish victory after failed peace talks
 1849 –
Battle of Chillianwala 13 January – British forces under Gough fight another indecisive battle with Sikhs, resulting in Gough's dismissal
 Siege of Multan 22 January – British forces capture fortress in Punjab.
 Battle of Gujarat 21 February – Gough, before getting word of dismissal, crushes Sikhs, Punjab annexed.
 Battle of Kápolna 26–27 February – Hungarian forces under Henry Dembinski defeated by Austrians under the Alfred I, Prince of Windisch-Grätz
 Battle of Novara 23 March – Radetzky defeats Charles Albert, forcing Piedmontese to make peace
 Battle of Szolnok 5 March – Hungarian forces led by General Damjanich defeat Austrian forces.
 Ten Days of Brescia 23 March – 1 April – Popular riot against the Austrian garrisons
 Battle of Hatvan 2 April
 Battle of Tápióbicske 4 April
Battle of Isaszeg (or Gödöllö) 6 April – Hungarian forces led by general Görgei defeat Austrians (Windisch-Grätz, Schlick)
 Battle of El Número 17 April
 Battle of Nagysalló 19 April
 First Battle of Komárom 26 April
 Battle of Las Carreras 21–22 April
Battle of Buda 21 May – Hungarians take back the capital from Austrians.
 Battle of Csorna 13 June
 Battle of Pered 20-21 June
 Battle of Győr 28 June
 Second Battle of Komárom 2 July
 Third Battle of Komárom 11 July
 Battle of Kirchheimbolanden 14 June
 Battle of Ludwigshafen 15–18 June
 Battle of Rinnthal 17 June
Battle of Pered 20–21 June
Battle of Győr 28 June
Battle of Hegyes 14 July
Battle of Segesvár 31 July – Hungarian forces under Józef Bem defeated by Russians, Austrians under general Luders and general Dick
Battle of Szőreg 5 August
Battle of Temesvár 9 August – Austrian forces under Haynau defeat Hungarians under Artúr Görgey, Bem in final battle of war
 1851 
 Battle of La Arada - Assured Guatemalan sovereignty.
 Bombardment of Salé - French won battle, but withdraw from Morocco.
 1852 –
 Battle of Monte Caseros 3 February – A coalition of the Argentine Provinces of Entre Rios and Corrientes, allied with Brazilian and Uruguayan troops (27,000 men) defeats Buenos Aires forces (22,000 men) under Juan Manuel Rosas, presidente of Argentina.
 Battle of Gur Amba 27 September – The future Emperor of Ethiopia Tewodros II defeats and kills the vassal of the current ruler of Ethiopia, Ras Ali II.
 Battle of Berea 20 December – British force under Major-General Sir George Cathcart invades Basutoland but is forced to withdraw by Chief Moshoeshoe
 Battle of Dimawe - skirmish between Tswana tribes and Boer people.
 1853 –
 Battle of Takusa 12 April – The future Emperor of Ethiopia Tewodros II defeats an allied army from the provinces of Tigray, Wollo, Yejju, and Gojjam led by Dejazmach Birru Aligaz of Yejju. Dejazmach Biru is killed.
 Battle of Ayshal 29 June – The future Emperor of Ethiopia Tewodros II defeats Ras Ali II; considered the end of the Zemene Mesafint ("Era of Princes") in Ethiopia.
 Battle of Oltenitza 4 November – Russians defeated by Ottoman troops (Crimean War)
Battle of Akhaltsikhe 24 November
Battle of Başgedikler 1 December
 1854 –
Battle of Citate 6 January – Ottoman troops defeat Russians during the Crimean War
Battle of Amba Jebelli March – The future Emperor of Ethiopia Tewodros II defeats Birru Goshu of Gojjam.
Battle of Ojo Caliente Canyon 8 April
Bombardment of Odessa 22 April - Anglo-French warships attack the Russian port of Odesa.
Siege of Silistria 11 May-23 June - Russians launch an attack at an Ottoman fort in Bulgaria, but are repelled.
Battle of Nigoiti 20-27 May - Russian forces defeat Ottomans, the morale boost and achieved superiority allowing the strategic victory later at Choloki.
Battle of Choloki June 4 - Russians defeat Ottomans on the outskirts of Kakuti
Battle of Bomarsund August
Battle of Kurekdere 6 August
Battle of Alma 20 September – British and French, under French general Saint-Arnaud, defeat a Russian army during the Crimean War.
Battle of the Diablo Mountains 3 October
Siege of Sevastopol 17 October–9 September 1855 - Allies capture the city.
Battle of Balaclava 25 October – Charge of the Light Brigade on Crimea under Cardigan
Battle of Inkerman 5 November – British, helped by French of general Bosquet, defeat a Russian army.
Eureka Rebellion 3 December – British Army and Victoria Police defeat Eureka gold field rebels
 1855 –
Battle of Derasge 9 February – Tewodros II defeats Dejasmach Wube, deposing the last rival warlord of the Zemene Mesafint ("Era of Princes").
 Battle of Eupatoria 17 February – Allies win naval battle.
Battle of Nam Quan 10 May
Siege of Taganrog 3 June-24 November - After numerous British and French attacks, Russians hold the city of Taganrog, albeit the city was in ruins.
Skirmish at the Genitchi Strait 3 July - British soldiers destroyed a strategic Russian pontoon bridge.
Battle of Ty-ho Bay 4 August
Battle of Suomenlinna 9-11 August - Indecisive
Battle of Traktir 16 August – French army and any Piedmontese troops defeat a Russian army near the Tchernaïa river.
Battle of the Leotung 19 August 
Battle of Ash Hollow 3 September
Battle of Malakoff 8 September – French army, under general Pelissier and general Mac-Mahon, takes Malakoff and defeat Russian army. Fall of the city of Sebastopol and end of crimean war.
Battle of the Great Redan 8 September - British forces attack Russian forces in Sevastopol
Battle of Kinburn 17 October
Siege of Kars June–29 November – Russians defeat Ottoman troops
Battle of Santomé 22 December
Battle of Kaba - skirmish between Fijian leader Seru Epenisa Cakobau and his enemies from surrounding islands Rewa and Bau.
 1856 –
 Battle of Sabana Larga and Jácuba 24 January
 First Battle of Seattle (1856) 26 January – Marines from the USS Decatur drive off American Indian attackers after all day battle with settlers.
Battle of Santa Rosa 20 March – Costa Rican troops rout Walker's soldiers
Battle of Rivas 11 April – Central American coalition defeats filibuster William Walker
Battle of the Bogue 12–13 November – British victory in the Second Opium War.
Battle of the Barrier Forts 16–24 November
Second Bombardment of Tourane - French forces attack Da Nang again after Thiệu Trị forbids European contact.
 1857 –
Battle of Macao Fort 4 January
Battle of Cooke's Spring 9 March
Battle of Escape Creek 25–27 May
Siege of Lucknow 30 May – 27 November – Lucknow besieged by rebels, relieved, besieged again, and relieved for a second time.
Siege of Cawnpore 5–25 June – British troops and civilians besieged and later betrayed and murdered during the Indian Rebellion
Battle of Chinhat 30 June – British troops retreat to Lucknow during the Indian Rebellion
Battle of Jhelum 7 July – Battle sparked by an attempt to disarm the 14th Bengal Native Infantry who mutinied and were then destroyed by a larger force during the Indian Mutiny.
Battle of Aong 15 July – British forces under General Henry Havelock capture Cawnpore, India.
Battle of Devil's River 20 July
Siege of Medina Fort - Toucouleuri forces laid siege to French ones trapped at Médine, now Senegal.
 1858 – 
Battle of Malgram – 9 January – British forces finally defeat Rajab Ali Khan of Chittagong
Battle of Celaya (1858) 8–9 March
Battle of Grahovac 28 April – 1 May – Montenegro defeated Ottoman army in Grahovo. This battle brought first official Turkish recognition of borders of Montenegro.
Battle of Little Robe Creek 12 May
Battle of Pine Creek 17 May
Battle of Atenquique 2 June
Battle of Four Lakes 1 September
Battle of Spokane Plains 5 September
Battle of Ixtlahuaca 18 September
Battle of Ahualulco 29 September
Battle of San Joaquín 26 December
 1859 –
Battle of Logandème 18 May – Serer people of Sine (present-day Senegal) against French colonialism. French victory.
 Battle of Montebello 20 May – French army, under general Forey, defeat an Austrian army.
 Battle of Varese 26 May – Piedmontese defeat Austrians in the Austro-Sardinian War.
 Battle of San Fermo 27 May
Battle of Palestro 30 May – French zouaves and Piedmontese defeat an Austrian army.
 Battle of Turbigo 3 June
Battle of Magenta 4 June – French army, under Louis-Napoleon, defeat Austrian army under general Giulay. Liberation of Milano.
Battle of Solferino 24 June – French army and Piedmontese army, under Louis-Napoléon, defeat an Austrian army under archiduc François-Joseph. Started the birth of the Red Cross. End of second war of Italian independence.
 Battle of Tlatempa 5 July
 Battle of Loma de las Ánimas 1 November
 Battle of Estancia de las Vacas 13 November
1860 –
Battle of Loma Alta 24 January
Battle of Antón Lizardo 6 March
Battle of Calatafimi 15 May – Garibaldi's victory against Neapolitan troops.
Battle of Peñuelas 14 June
Battle of Milazzo 25 June – Garibaldi's victory against Neapolitan troops.
Battle of Silao 10 August
Battle of Castelfidardo 18 September – Italian victory over the Papal troops.
Battle of the Volturnus 1 October – Sicilians are defeated by the Piedmontese
Siege of Gaeta 5 November – 13 February 1861 – Francis II of the Two Sicilies is sieged by the Piedmontese.
Battle of the Mimbres River 4 December
Battle of Pease River 19 December
Battle of Calpulapan 22 December

1861
 1861 -
Battle of Fort Sumter 12 April – P.G.T. Beauregard fires on Fort – first important battle of American Civil War
 Battle of Sewell's Point 18–19 May – Union gunboats fight inconclusive battle with Confederate artillery.
 Battle of Aquia Creek 29 May – 1 June – Confederate artillery hit by naval bombardment, later withdrawn.
 Battle of Philippi Races 3 June – Union troops under McClellan defeats rebels
 Battle of Big Bethel 10 June – Union attack on Confederate positions near a church repelled.
 Battle of Boonville 17 June – Union forces defeat pro-Confederate governor's Missouri State Guard.
 Battle of Hoke's Run 2 July – Robert Patterson defeats Confederate force but fails to capitalize on his victory.
 Battle of Carthage 5 July – Confederate victory in Missouri during the American Civil War.
 Battle of Rich Mountain 11 July – Confederate force split in half mid-battle; one half surrenders, the other escapes.
 Battle of Blackburn's Ford 18 July – Irvin McDowell defeated in recon-in-force against Confederate forces at Manassas.
 Battle of 1st Bull Run, or 1st Manassas 21 July – Union under McDowell lose to Confederates under J.E. Johnston, P.G.T. Beauregard, Jackson anointed Stonewall
 Battle of Athens 5 August – Union victory in small skirmish in Northeast Missouri
 Battle of Wilson's Creek 10 August – Union forces lose
 Battle of Kessler's Cross Lanes 26 August – Confederates surprise and defeat Union forces.
 Battle of Hatteras Inlet Batteries 28–29 August – Union forces capture two North Carolina forts.
 Battle of Dry Wood Creek 2 September – Union cavalry from Kansas defeated by Missouri State Guard.
 Battle of Carnifex Ferry 10 September – Confederates withdraw by night after several hours of fighting.
 Battle of Cheat Mountain 12–15 September – 300 Union troops withstand uncoordinated Confederate attacks.
 First Battle of Lexington 13–20 September – Union forces badly defeated by Missouri State Guard.
 Battle of Liberty 17 September – Minor Missouri State Guard victory.
 Battle of Barbourville 19 September – Confederate victory over Union forces.
 Battle of Canada Alamosa 24–25 September
Battle of Pinos Altos 27 September
Battle of Greenbrier River 3 October – Confederates withdraw after inconclusive battle.
Battle of Cockle Creek 5 October
Battle of Santa Rosa Island 9 October – Union forces capture island.
Battle of the Head of Passes 12 October
Battle of Bolivar Heights 16 October – Union victory near Harpers Ferry
Battle of Camp Wildcat 21 October – Union victory over Confederate forces.
Battle of Leesburg 21 October – 1900 Union soldiers die
Battle of Fredericktown 21 October – Missouri State Guard defeated.
First Battle of Springfield 25 October – Union forces capture town.
Battle of Belmont 7 November – Grant captures and destroys Confederate supplies near Cairo, Illinois
Battle of Ivy Mountain 8 November – Union victory over Confederate forces.
Battle of Round Mountain 19 November – Confederate forces defeat Opothleyahola near present-day Stillwater.
Battle of Chusto-Talasah 9 December – Opothleyahola defeated near present-day Tulsa.
Battle of Camp Alleghany 13 December – Confederates withstand Union attack.
Battle of Rowlett's Station 17 December – An inconclusive battle fought in Kentucky.
Battle of Dranesville 20 December – Union defeats Confederate forces under J.E.B. Stuart.
Battle of Chustenahlah 26 December – Opothleyahola defeated, flees to Kansas.
Battle of Mount Zion Church 28 December – Union victory in Northeastern Missouri.

1862

 1862 -
Battle of Cockpit Point 3 January – Inconclusive battle in Virginia during the Civil War.
 Battle of Hancock 5–6 January – Unsuccessful Confederate attack on Maryland town.
 Battle of Roan's Tan Yard 8 January – Confederates routed.
 Battle of Middle Creek 10 January – Union forces under James A. Garfield defeat Confederates under Humphrey Marshall.
 Battle of Lucas Bend 11 January
Battle of Mill Springs 19 January – Union victory, Felix Zollicoffer killed.
Battle of Fort Henry 6 February – Ulysses S. Grant and gunboats under Andrew Hull Foote take fort and gain control of Tennessee River
Battle of Roanoke Island 7–8 February – Union forces under Ambrose E. Burnside capture island.
Battle of Elizabeth City 10 February – Destruction of the Mosquito Fleet.
Battle of Fort Donelson 11–16 February – Grant takes fort, accepts surrender of Confederate army, and gains control of Cumberland River
Battle of Valverde 20–21 February – Union forces routed in New Mexico Territory.
Battle of Pea Ridge 7 March – Missouri saved for Union
Battle of Hampton Roads 9 March – Monitor defeats Merrimac
Battle of New Bern 14 March – Union troops disembark from ships and capture town.
First Battle of Kernstown 23 March – Union forces defeat Confederates under "Stonewall" Jackson.
Battle of Glorieta 26–28 March – Union forces outmaneuver Confederates near Santa Fe.
Battle of Shiloh 6–7 April – Ulysses S. Grant attacked by Albert Sidney Johnston and P.G.T. Beauregard, defeats them
Battle of Island Number Ten 28 February – 8 April – Union victory by Pope
Battle of Ft. Pulaski 10–11 April – Union takes fort
Battle of Peralta 15 April – Union forces defeat the 5th Texas Mounted Volunteers.
Battle of Forts Jackson and St. Philip 18–28 April - Union victory for possession of New Orleans.
Battle of South Mills 19 April – Confederates thwart attempt to destroy a canal.
Battle of Fort Macon 23 March – 26 April – Confederate fort surrenders after Union artillery bombardment.
Battle of New Orleans (25 April – 1 May) – Union forces capture city.
Battle of Yorktown 5 April – 4 May – Union troops win skirmish near site of decisive Revolutionary War battle.
Battle of Puebla 5 May – Cinco de Mayo – Mexicans defeat French
Battle of Williamsburg – McClellan and Longstreet fight inconclusive battle.
Battle of Eltham's Landing 7 May – Inconclusive battle in Virginia.
Battle of McDowell 8–9 May – Stonewall Jackson's Confederates defeat Union forces.
Battle of Drewry's Bluff 15 May – Union naval attack repelled by Confederate artillery.
Battle of Princeton Court House 15–17 May - Confederate victory over Union forces.
Battle of Whitney's Lane 19 May – Union campaign towards Little Rock, Arkansas halted
Battle of Front Royal 23 May – Stonewall Jackson forces Union retreat by threatening the rear of the Union force.
First Battle of Winchester 25 May – Stonewall Jackson defeats Nathaniel P. Banks.
Battle of Hanover Courthouse 27 May – Union victory during the American Civil War.
Siege of Corinth 29 April – 30 May – Union forces capture town, Beauregard tricks Union in order to escape to Tupelo.
Battle of Seven Pines 31 May – J.E. Johnston attacks Union forces, wounded, inconclusive
Battle of Tranter's Creek 5 June – Confederate forces retreat after Colonel Singletary is killed.
Battle of Memphis 6 June – Union forces capture the city.
First Battle of Chattanooga 7–8 June – Union forces bombard the town.
Battle of Cross Keys 8 June – John C. Frémont defeated by elements of Stonewall Jackson's force.
Battle of Port Republic 9 June – Costly victory for Stonewall Jackson.
Battle of Secessionville 16 June – Union fails to take town, Union commander later court-martialed for disobeying orders.
Battle of Saint Charles 17 June – The USS Mound City is hit by Confederate shore gun and explodes.
Battle of Simmon's Bluff 21 June - Minor bloodless victory by Union forces.
Battle of Oak Grove 25 June – Indecisive battle between McClellan and Lee.
Battle of Beaver Dam Creek 26 June – Robert E. Lee defeated.
Battle of Gaines' Mill 27 June – Lee defeats McClellan.
Battle of Garnett's & Golding's Farm 27–28 June – Indecisive battle between Lee and McClellan.
Battle of Savage's Station 29 June – Union forces withdraw
Battle of White Oak Swamp 30 June – Indecisive artillery duel during the American Civil War.
Battle of Glendale 30 June – McClellan retreats from Lee's Confederates.
Battle of Tampa 30 June – 1 July – Union gunboat attacks, but later withdraws.
Battle of Malvern Hill 1 July – McClellan defeats Lee but withdraws after battle.
Battle of Locust Grove 3 July
Battle of Hill's Plantation 7 July – Union victory in Arkansas.
Battle of Cotton Plant 7 July
First Battle of Murfreesboro 13 July – Confederate victory during the American Civil War.
Battle of Apache Pass 15–16 July
Battle of Moore's Mill 28 July
Battle of Baton Rouge 5 August
Battle of Kirksville 6–9 August – Union forces capture town.
Battle of Cedar Mountain 9 August – Union forces repelled by Confederate counter-attack.
First Battle of Donaldsonville 9 August - Minor bloodless victory by Union forces.
First Battle of Independence 11 August – Confederate victory near Kansas City.
Battle of Lone Jack 15–16 August – Confederate victory, Union commander killed.  Confederates forced to withdraw after battle.
Battle of Redwood Ferry 18 August
Battle of Fort Ridgely 21–22 August – Failed Santee Sioux attack on Union controlled fort.
First Battle of Rappahannock Station 22–25 August – Union supplies destroyed during skirmish.
Battle of Bull Run Bridge – Confederates capture and destroy Manassas Station.
Battle of Thoroughfare Gap 28 August – Longstreet defeats small union force.
Battle of Aspromonte 29 August – Italian royal forces defeat rebels
Battle of 2nd Bull Run, or Second Manassas 30 August – Jackson, Lee, and Longstreet destroys Pope's Army of Northern Virginia
Battle of Richmond (Kentucky) 30 August – Confederates under Edmund Kirby Smith rout Union army under Gen. William Nelson
Battle of Chantilly 1 September – Union forces escape from nearly being cut off, Philip Kearny is killed.
Battle of Mile Hill 2 September – Confederates clear Leesburg of Federal forces.
Battle of Harpers Ferry 12–15 September – Stonewall Jackson captures Union garrison.
Battle of South Mountain 14 September – McClellan defeats Lee.
Battle of Munfordville 14–17 September – Union force surrenders.
Battle of Antietam 17 September – McClellan ends Lee's invasion of North, bloodiest day of war
Battle of Iuka 19 September – Grant is victorious near Mississippi town.
Battle of Shepherdstown 19–20 September – Confederate brigades counterattack and defeat pursuing Union brigades.
Battle of Wood Lake 23 September – United States victory over the Lakota during the Dakota War of 1862.
First Battle of Sabine Pass 24–25 September – Minor bloodless victory by Union forces.
Battle of Augusta (1862) 27 September
First Battle of Newtonia 30 September – Union forces panic under bombardment from Confederate artillery.
Battle of St. John's Bluff 1–3 October - Bloodless victory by Union forces near present-day Jacksonville, Florida.
Second Battle of Corinth 3–4 October – Confederate attack fails.
Battle of Galveston Harbor or First Battle of Galveston 4 October – Bloodless Union victory.
Battle of Hatchie's Bridge 5 October – Confederate force under Earl Van Dorn escapes across river.
Battle of Perryville 8 October – Buell v. Bragg, indecisive
Battle of Old Fort Wayne 22 October – Union victory in Indian Territory now present day Oklahoma.
Battle of Georgia Landing 27 October – Union victory in Louisiana.
Battle of Clark's Mill 7 November – Union force surrenders to larger Confederate force.
Battle of Cane Hill 28 November – Small Confederate force delays Union while larger force escapes.
Battle of Prairie Grove 7 December – Union secures NW Arkansas
Battle of Hartsville 7 December – Disguised in Union uniforms, Confederates infiltrate and defeat Union forces.
Battle of Fredericksburg 13 December – Lee routs Burnside
Battle of Kinston 14 December – Union forces under John G. Foster defeat Confederates under Nathan Evans.
Battle of White Hall 16 December – Foster fights indecisive battle with Beverly Robertson
Battle of Goldsboro Bridge 17 December – Foster defeats Confederates and destroys the bridge.
Battle of Jackson, Tennessee 19 December – Confederate feint to distract Union forces.
Battle of Chickasaw Bayou 26–29 December – Union attack on Confederate right flank thwarted.
Battle of Parker's Cross Roads 31 December – Confederates repel Union double-pronged assault.

1863
 1863 -
Battle of Murfreesboro or Stones River 31 December 1862 – 2 January 1863 – Forces fight to draw
 Second Battle of Springfield 8 January – Confederates enter town, but are unable to take nearby fort.
 Battle of Arkansas Post 9 January – Part of Vicksburg Campaign, fight for control of mouth of Arkansas River
 Battle of Hartville 9–11 January – Confederates are victorious, but unable to continue raid.
 Battle of Ciołków - 22 January - first skirmish of January Uprising
 Battle of Szydłowiec - 22-23 January - Polish insurgents raid Szydłowiec
 Battle of Lubartów - 22-23 January - Failed Polish attack on Lubartów
 Bear River Massacre 29 January – Shoshone forces massacred by Union troops.
 Battle of Deserted House 30 January
Battle of Dover 3 February – Failed Confederate attack on town.
Battle of Węgrów - 3 February - Russians recapture town taken by Poles
Battle of Rawa - 4 February - Poles defeat Russians
Battle of Sosnowiec - 6-7 February - Polish victory
Battle of Siemiatycze - 6-7 February - Russians defeat Polish insurgents
Battle of Słupcza - 8 February - Failed Polish attack
Battle of Miechów - 17 February - Russians foil a Polish attack
Battle of Staszów 17 February – Indecisive battle between Poland and Russia as part of January Uprising
Battle of Krzywosądz - 19 February - Russians defeat poles
First Battle of Nowa Wieś - 21 February - Ludwik Mierosławski resigns as leader of January Uprising
Battle of Dobra  - 24 February - Poles get ambushed
Battle of Małogoszcz 24 February – Polish forced to retreat.
Battle of Mrzygłód - 1 March - Poles defeat Russians
Battle of Pieskowa Skała - 4 March - Polish victory
Battle of Skała - 5 March - Poles defeat Russians
Battle of Thompson's Station 5 March – Confederate victory in Tennessee.
Battle of Fort Anderson 13–15 March – Daniel H. Hill leads unsuccessful Confederate attack on New Bern.
Battle of Chroberz - 17 March - Pyrrhic Polish victory
Battle of Kelly's Ford 17 March – Indecisive cavalry battle during the American Civil War.
Battle of Grochowiska - 18 March - One of the bloodiest battles of the January Uprising
Battle of Vaught's Hill 20 March – Union forces withstand attack by John Hunt Morgan's Confederates.
Battle of Igołomia - 21 March - Poles attack and then escape
Battle of Krasnobród - Russians defeat Poles
Battle of Brentwood 25 March – Union force surrenders.
Battle of Washington 30 March – 19 April – Hill unable to take North Carolina town from Union forces.
First Battle of Franklin 10 April – Confederates withdraw after rearguard defeat.
Battle of Suffolk (11 April – 4 May) Twin indecisive battles at Norfleet House and Hill's Point fought over town.
Battle of Praszka - 11 April - Poles surprise and ambush Russians
Battle of Buda Zaborowska - 14 April - Russians attack Poles
Battle of Borowe Młyny - 16 April - Unknown victor
Grierson's Raid 17 April – Deep Union cavalry raid toward Baton Rouge, Louisiana, serves as a diversion of Confederate forces during Grant's VIcksburg campaign.
Battle of Genėtiniai - Lithuanians defeat Russians
 Battle of Newton's Station 24 April
Battle of Cape Girardeau 26 April – Confederate attack fails.
Second Battle of Nowa Wieś - Poles under a Frenchman defeat Russians
Battle of Grand Gulf 29 April – Unsuccessful naval attack by Grant's forces.
Battle of Snyder's Bluff 29 April – 1 May – Union feint during Vicksburg Campaign.
Battle of Pyzdry - 29 April - major Polish victory
Battle of Day's Gap 30 April – Union victory during a raid in Alabama.
Battle of Camarón 30 April – Regarding by the French Foreign Legion as a defining moment in its history.
Battle of Port Gibson 1 May – In Vicksburg campaign, Grant defeats Confederates
Battle of Chalk Bluff 1–2 May – Confederates win but can't continue raid.
Battle of Chancellorsville 2 May – Lee defeats Hooker's Army of Potomac, Jackson killed
Second Battle of Fredericksburg 3 May – Union forces under John Sedgwick defeat Confederate forces left to guard the town by Lee.
Battle of Salem Church 3–4 May – Lee defeats Sedgwick.
Battle of Stok - 4-5 May - one of the biggest Polish victories
Battle of Krzykawka - 5 May - Russians defeat Italians and Poles.
Battle of Kobylanka - 6 May - Poles clash with Russians
Battle of Biržai - 7-9 May - Lithuanian insurrection defeated
First Battle of Ignacewo - 8 May - Russians defeat and massacre Poles.
Battle of Huta Krzeszowska - 11 May - Russian victory
Battle of Raymond 12 May – Failed Confederate attempt to protect Vicksburg from approaching Federals.
Battle of Jackson (MS) 14 May – Sherman, McPherson defeat Johnston
Battle of Champion's Hill 16 May – Grant defeats Confederates
Battle of Miropol - 16-17 May - Russian victory
Battle of Horki - 17-25 May - Russian victory
Battle of Big Black River Bridge 17 May – Confederate forces trapped in Vicksburg.
Battle of Plains Store 21 May – Union victory near Baton Rouge.
Battle of Salicha - 26 May - pivotal battle in January Uprising
First Battle of Chruślina - 30 May - Pyrrhic victory for Russians
Battle of Nagoszewo - 2-3 June - Russian victory
Battle of Milliken's Bend 7 June – Confederates unable to break Siege of Vicksburg.
Battle of Brandy Station 9 June – Pleasonton surprises Jeb Stuart's cavalrymen in their camps near Brandy Station
Second Battle of Winchester 13–15 June – Confederate victory paves way for Lee's invasion.
Battle of Lututów - 15 June - Polish attack on Lututów fails
Battle of Aldie 17 June – Indecisive battle during Robert E. Lee's march north.
Battle of Middleburg 17–19 June – J.E.B. Stuart retreats from engagement with Union cavalry.
Battle of Komorów - 20 June - Russian victory
 Battle of LaFourche Crossing 20–21 June
Battle of Upperville 21 June – Indecisive cavalry battle during Lee's invasion.
Battle of Hoover's Gap 24–26 June – Union victory prevents Confederates in Tennessee from coming to the aid of Vicksburg.
Battle of Goodrich's Landing 29–30 June – Confederates drive Union Black Regiments off of several plantations.
Battle of Hanover 30 June – J.E.B. Stuart forced to change his route, delaying his efforts to unite with Lee's force outside Gettysburg.
Battle of Gettysburg 1–3 July – Lee loses to Meade, Pickett's Charge fails, ends second invasion of North
Battle of Vicksburg 4 July – siege from 22 May ends, Grant accepts surrender of second Confederate army
Battle of Helena 4 July – Confederate assault on river port fails securing eastern Arkansas for Union
Battle of Boonsboro 8 July – indecisive action at rearguard of Lee's retreat.
Siege of Port Hudson 21 May – 9 July – last Confederate stronghold on Mississippi surrenders.
Battle of Corydon 9 July – Confederate raid results in civilian casualties, including a Lutheran minister.
Battle of Ossa - 10 July - Polish victory
First Assault on Morris Island 11 July – First of two Union attempts to take Ft. Wagner.
Battle of Williamsport 6–16 July – Meade and Lee fight indecisive battle.
 Battle of Kock's Plantation 12–13 July
 Battle of Coștangalia 15 July - Polish insurrects defeated Romanian forces
Battle of Honey Springs 17 July – In Indian Territory, two largely Black and Native American forces meet. Union victory.
Battle of Fort Wagner, Morris Island 18 July – second of two Union attempts to take Ft. Wagner fails, heroism of the 54th Massachusetts.
 Battle of Buffington Island 19 July
Battle of Manassas Gap 23 July – Indecisive battle by day, Confederates withdraw by night.
Battle of Big Mound 24–25 July – Union forces defeat Santee and Teton Sioux forces.
Battle of Dead Buffalo Lake 26 July – Sibley defeats Sioux forces.
Battle of Salineville 26 July – Confederate Brigadier General John Hunt Morgan surrenders in Ohio: the northernmost Battle of the American Civil War.
Battle of Stony Lake 28 July – Sioux forces escape Union forces in pursuit.
Second Battle of Chruślina - 4 August - Polish victory
Battle of Depułtycze - 5 August - Polish victory
Battle of Żyrzyn - 8 August - Polish victory
Second Battle of Fort Sumter 17 August – 9 September – Union attempt to retake fort fails even after massive bombardment and naval attack.
Second Battle of Chattanooga 21 August – 8 September – Union captures town.
Battle of Złoczew - 22 August - Russian victory, Poles withdraw
Battle of Lawrence 23 August – Quantrill's Raiders pillage the city.
Battle of Fajsławice - 24 August - Decisive Polish defeat
Battle of Sędziejowice - 26 August - Polish victory
Battle of Devil's Backbone 1 September – Union victory after heavy fighting.
Battle of Panasówka - 3 September - Polish victory
Battle of Whitestone Hill 3–5 September – Union forces defeat several Native American tribes including Sioux and Blackfeet.
Battle of Sowia Góra - 6 September - Russians defeat Poles and Hungarians
Second Battle of Sabine Pass 8 September – Confederate forces place stakes in river to help aim their guns at Union ships, Confederate victory.
Battle of Bayou Fourche 10 September – Union victory allows for capture of Little Rock.
Battle of Davis' Cross Roads 10–11 September – Union forces establish defensive positions prior to Chickamauga.
Battle of Chickamauga 19 September – Bragg defeats Rosecrans, George Thomas of US anointed "The Rock of Chickamauga"
Battle of Blountville 22 September – Union forces capture town.
 Battle of Stirling's Plantation 29 September
 Battle of Mełchów - 30 September - Polish and Hungarian forces defeat Russians
Battle of Baxter Springs 6 October – Quantrill's Raiders massacre Union Black Troops during the American Civil War.
Battle of Blue Springs 10 October – Confederate forces overrun.
First Battle of Collierville 11 October - Union victory
First Battle of Auburn 13 October – J.E.B. Stuart escapes by hiding in a ravine.
Second Battle of Auburn 14 October – Confederates attack Union rearguard, indecisive.
Battle of Bristoe Station 14 October – Meade defeats elements of Lee's forces, but Confederates destroy railroad during retreat.
 Battle of Charlestown 18 October
Battle of Buckland Mills 19 October – Union cavalry caught in ambush, defeated.
Battle of Rybnica - 20 October - Poles defeat Cossacks
Battle of Pine Bluff 25 October – Confederate attack fails.
Battle of Wauhatchie 28–29 October – Longstreet defeated by Union forces.
Second Battle of Collierville 3 November – Abortive Confederate attack on the town.
 Battle of Droop Mountain 6 November
Second Battle of Rappahannock Station 7 November – Union forces surge across river, forcing Lee to retreat.
Battle of Campbell's Station 16 November – Confederate double-envelopment attempt fails.
 Battle of Mustang Island 17 November
Battle of Rangiriri, 20–21 November - New Zealand Wars
Third Battle of Chattanooga 23–25 November – Grant defeats Braxton Bragg and relieves Union forces besieged in Chattanooga
First Battle of Opatów - 25 November - Poles capture town
Battle of Ringgold Gap 27 November – Confederates under Patrick Cleburne defeat Union forces under Joseph Hooker.
Battle of Fort Sanders 29 November – Longstreet unable to take fort due to poor quality gunpowder.
Battle of Mine Run 27 November – 2 December – Meade bombards Lee's Confederates but then withdraws.
Battle of Bean's Station 14 December – Union forces withdraw a short distance.
Battle of Mossy Creek 29 December – Confederate cavalry forced back.

1864
 1864 -
Battle of Pecos River 4 January
Battle of Loudoun Heights 10 January
Battle of Canyon de Chelly 12–14 January
Battle of Dandridge 17 January – Union forces withdraw
Battle of Iłża - Polish victory
Battle of Athens 26 January – Union victory in Northern Alabama.
Battle of Fair Garden 27 January – Union Pyrrhic victory.
Battle of Sankelmark 6 February
Battle of Morton's Ford 6–7 February – Diversionary Union attack.
Battle of Middle Boggy Depot 13 February
Battle of Meridian 14 February – Sherman occupies town
Battle of Olustee 20 February – Union can't take Florida
Second Battle of Opatów - 21 February - end of January Uprising
Battle of Walkerton 2 March 
Battle of Jasmund 17 March
Battle of Laredo 18 March
Battle of Paducah 25 March – Confederate raid by Forrest successful.
Battle of Elkin's Ferry 3–4 April – Confederates unable to prevent Union river crossing.
Battle of Mount Gray 7 April
Battle of Mansfield 8 April – Banks Union Red River Campaign halted by rebels
Battle of Pleasant Hill 9 April – Confederate attack fails.
Battle of Prairie D'Ane 9–13 April – Frederick Steele defeats Sterling Price.
Battle of Fort Pillow 12 April – N.B. Forrest takes fort, massacres black soldiers
Battle of Poison Spring 18 April – Part of Red River Campaign in Arkansas, black troops massacred
Battle of Dybbøl 18 April – Key defeat for Denmark in the Second War of Schleswig
Battle of Monett's Ferry 23 April – Confederate forces driven back.
Battle of Marks' Mills 25 April – Part of Red River Campaign in Arkansas
Battle of Jenkins' Ferry 30 April – Part of Red River Campaign in Arkansas
Battle of the Wilderness 5 May – Grant and Lee meet inconclusively
Battle of Albemarle Sound 5 May – Indecisive naval battle during the American Civil War.
Battle of Port Walthall Junction 6–7 May – Union forces destroy railroad
Battle of Heligoland 9 May – Danish sea victory over Austria. Last significant battle involving wooden ships on both sides.
Battle of Cloyd's Mountain 9 May – Union victory, Confederate General Albert G. Jenkins killed.
Battle of Swift Creek 9 May – Union forces damage railroad, but are stopped by Confederate forces.
Battle of Cove Mountain 10 May – Union victory after brief battle.
Battle of Chester Station 10 May – Union forces under Benjamin Butler pushed back.
Battle of Yellow Tavern 11 May – Union forces win cavalry battle, J.E.B. Stuart is killed.
Battle of Rocky Face Ridge 8–13 May Indecisive battle near Atlanta.
Battle of Resaca 13 May – Sherman defeats Johnston
Battle of New Market 15 May – Confederate forces halt Union army under Franz Sigel from advance up Shenandoah Valley
Battle of Proctor's Creek 12–16 May – Beauregard defeats Butler.
Battle of Adairsville 17 May – Failed Confederate attempt to destroy part of the Union force approaching Atlanta.
Battle of Yellow Bayou 18 May - Final battle of the Red River Campaign in Louisiana, Union forces successfully cross the Atchafalaya River
Battle of Ware Bottom Church 20 May – Beauregard boxes Butler in.
Battle of Spotsylvania Court House 8–21 May – Grant and Lee meet inconclusively, Grant writes to Halleck "I propose to fight it out on this line if it takes all summer"
Battle of Wilson's Wharf 24 May – Confederates under Fitzhugh Lee defeated by two Union black regiments.
Battle of North Anna 23–26 May – Lee outmaneuvers Grant, but because of illness, he is unable to capitalize.
Battle of New Hope Church 25–26 May – Hooker's forces defeated.
Battle of Pickett's Mill 27 May – Unsuccessful attack by Sherman on Johnston.
Battle of Haw's Shop 28 May – Union advance halted.
Battle of Dallas (Georgia) 28 May – Confederate withdrawal in Georgia.
Battle of Totopotomoy Creek 28–30 May – Union forces pushed back.
Battle of Old Church 30 May – Union forces drive Confederates back to Cold Harbor.
Battle of Cold Harbor 31 May – 12 June – Lee repulses Grant, Confederate general says "This is not war, this is murder".
Battle of Piedmont 5 June – Union forces under David Hunter defeat Confederate defenses on march to Staunton, Virginia, upper Shenandoah Valley
First Battle of Petersburg 9 June – Beauregard defeats Butler.
Battle of Brices Crossroads 10 June – N.B. Forrest routs Union force almost three times as large
Battle of Trevilian Station 11–12 June – Confederate victory, George Armstrong Custer nearly surrounded and has to be rescued by Sheridan.
Second Battle of Petersburg 15 June – 18 July – Lee repulses Grant at back door to Richmond.
Battle of Lynchburg 17 June
Sinking of CSS Alabama 19 June –  sinks CSS Alabama
Battle of Kolb's Farm 22 June – Confederate attack fails due to poor terrain conditions.
Battle of Jerusalem Plank Road 21–24 June – Union siege lines extended for Siege of Petersburg.
Battle of Saint Mary's Church 24 June – Union forces fight a successful delaying action.
Battle of Kennesaw Mountain 27 June – Johnston repulses Sherman
Battle of Als 29 June – Final battle of the Second War of Schleswig, Prussian victory over Denmark.
Battle of Marietta 9 June – 3 July – Sherman defeats Johnston
Battle of Monocacy Junction 9 July – Union General Lew Wallace slows up Jubal Early, saving DC
Battle of Fort Stevens 11–12 July – Failed confederate attempt to capture Washington, D.C., President Lincoln, observing the battle, comes under Confederate fire.
Battle of Tupelo 14–15 July – Union victory, Nathan Bedford Forrest wounded.
Battle of Cool Spring 17–18 July
Battle of Rutherford's Farm 20 July – Confederates under Jubal Early caught by surprise and defeated.
Battle of Peachtree Creek 20 July – Confederate attack fails
Battle of Atlanta 22 July – Sherman turns back Hood
Second Battle of Kernstown 24 July – Jubal Early defeats Union forces.
Battle of Killdeer Mountain 26 July – Union forces defeat Sioux.
Battle of Ezra Church 28 July – Confederates fail to gain element of surprise, finding entrenched Union forces.  Union victory.
Battle of the Crater 30 July – Lee defeats Burnside
Battle of Folck's Mill 1 August – Indecisive battle during the American Civil War.
Battle of Utoy Creek 5–7 August – Indecisive battle on Union right flank near Atlanta.
Second Battle of Dalton 14–15 August – Union forces withstand attack until relieved.
Battle of Gainesville 17 August
Battle of Globe Tavern 18–21 August – Confederate forces lose control of railroads at Petersburg.
Battle of Lovejoy's Station 20 August – Confederates repel Union raiders attacking the station.
Second Battle of Memphis 21 August – Partially successful Confederate raid.
Battle of Mobile Bay 23 August – David Farragut takes port, says "Damn the torpedoes, full speed ahead"
Second Battle of Ream's Station 25 August – Union lines overrun by Confederates.
Battle of Jonesborough 31 August – 1 September – William J. Hardee's Confederates defeated, resulting in Atlanta's fall.
Battle of Shimonoseki 5 September – 6 – Engagements since July 1863 pits U.S. and European allies against rebellious Japanese warlord
Third Battle of Winchester 19 September – Sheridan defeats Early, several officers killed or wounded on both sides.
Battle of Fisher's Hill 21–22 September – Successful Union frontal assault.
Battle of Fort Davidson 27 September – Union forces detonate their own fort after losing to Confederates.
Battle of Marianna 27 September
Battle of Chaffin's Farm 29–30 September – Union forces victorious, but fail to capture several forts.
Battle of Peebles' Farm 30 September – 2 October – Union victory near Petersburg.
Battle of Saltville 1–3 October – Confederates defeat Union Black Cavalry, war crimes committed against captured blacks.
Battle of Allatoona 5 October – Union fortifications hold.
Battle of Darbytown Road 7 October – Confederate attack repelled near Richmond.
Battle of Tom's Brook 9 October – Union cavalry defeats Confederates.
Capture of Sedalia 15 October – Confederate cavalry defeats Union militia
Battle of Glasgow, Missouri 15 October – Union forces surrender.
Second Battle of Lexington 19 October – Union forces driven out of town.
Battle of Cedar Creek 19 October – Sheridan defeats Early, drives rebels from Shenandoah Valley
Battle of Little Blue River 21 October – Confederate victory in Missouri.
Second Battle of Independence 22 October – Union forces occupy town.
Battle of Byram's Ford 22–23 October – Confederates under Marmaduke defeated.
Battle of Westport 23 October – Union forces win decisive battle to take control of Missouri.
Battle of Marais des Cygnes 25 October – Price's Confederates pursued into Kansas.
Battle of Mine Creek 25 October – Price's army crushed, flees back into Missouri.
Battle of Marmiton River 25 October – Price escapes Union pursuit.
Battle of Decatur 26–29 October – Confederates unable to cross river.
Battle of Boydton Plank Road 27–28 October – Union forces take control of road, but withdraw after battle.
Second Battle of Newtonia 28 October – James G. Blunt defeats Joseph O. Shelby.
Battle of Johnsonville 4–5 November – Confederates bombard Union forces during the night after a fire starts near union positions.
Battle of Bull's Gap 11–13 November – Minor Confederate victory during the American Civil War.
Sherman's March to the Sea 16 November – Sherman lays waste to South
Battle of Columbia 24 November – Confederates divert attention
First Battle of Adobe Walls 25 November – Kit Carson fights Kiowa forces to a draw, but manages to destroy their settlement.
Battle of Spring Hill 29 November – Confederate mistakes allow Federal forces to redeploy, leading to the Battle of Franklin.
Battle of Sand Creek – U.S. forces massacre Cheyenne and Arapaho.
Battle of Franklin 30 November – Hood attacks Thomas but loses
Battle of Waynesboro, Georgia 4 December – Kilpatrick stops Wheeler from attacking Sherman.
Third Battle of Murfreesboro 5–7 December – Confederate raid mostly unsuccessful.
First Battle of Fort Fisher 7–27 December – Failed Union attempt to take fort.
Battle of Nashville 15–16 December – Confederate Army in Tennessee overwhelmed.
Battle of Altamaha Bridge 19 December

1865
 1865 -
Battle of Julesburg 7 January
Battle of Dove Creek 8 January
Second Battle of Fort Fisher 15 January – Union takes fort
Battle of Trent's Reach 23–25 January 
Battle of Rivers' Bridge 3 February – Union forces capture river crossing.
Battle of Hatcher's Run 5 February – Union force launch unexpected attack.
Battle of Rush Creek 8–9 February
Battle of Fort Buchanan 17 February
Battle of Fort Myers 20 February
Battle of Wilmington (North Carolina) 22 February – Last rebel port falls
Battle of Waynesboro, Virginia 2 March – Jubal Anderson Early's army destroyed
Battle of Natural Bridge 6 March – Confederate victory in Florida prevents the capture of Tallahassee.
Battle of Wyse Fork 7–10 March – Confederate attacks repelled by Union artillery.
Battle of Mud Lake 14 March
Battle of Averasborough 16 March – Union and Confederate forces attack one another in turn, both attacks fail.
Battle of Bentonville 19–21 March – Sherman defeats Confederates
Wilson's Raid 22 March – 20 April – Union cavalry operate through Alabama and Georgia in the final stages of the Civil War, opposed by Nathan Bedford Forest.
Battle of Fort Steadman 25 March – Lee breaks siege
Battle of Lewis's Farm 29 March – Union forces capture Confederate earthworks.
Battle of White Oak Road 31 March – Confederate forces under Richard H. Anderson defeated.
Battle of Dinwiddie Court House 31 March – Pickett defeats Sheridan.
Battle of Five Forks 1 April – Sheridan routs Confederates in last important battle of the American Civil War.
Battle of Selma 2 April – Wilson defeats Forrest.
Third Battle of Petersburg 2 April – Grant defeats Lee.
Battle of Sutherland's Station 2 April – Lee's supply lines are cut.
Battle of Namozine Church 3 April – Several Confederates captured, Custer's brother earns Medal of Honor.
Battle of Sayler's Creek 6 April – Union victory, Lee realizes his army will not last long.
Battle of High Bridge 6–7 April – Union forces thwart Lee's attempts to burn bridges and to resupply, Grant proposes that Lee surrender, but he refuses.
Battle of Cumberland Church 7 April – Union forces attack Confederate rearguard, but darkness cuts the attack short.
Battle of Spanish Fort 27 March – 8 April – Union forces capture fort just east of Mobile.
Battle of Appomattox Station 8 April – Union forces thwart Lee's final attempt to resupply.
Battle of Fort Blakely 2–9 April – Union forces capture fort outside of Mobile.
Battle of Appomattox Courthouse 9 April – Lee's forces surrounded.  He subsequently surrenders.
Battle of Tacámbaro 11 April
Battle of Morrisville 13–15 April – Last cavalry battle of the American Civil War.
Battle of West Point 16 April – Union victory during final phase of American Civil War.
Battle of Columbus 16 April – Union victory in (what is considered) the final battle of the Civil war.
Battle of Palmito Ranch 12–13 May – Confederate victory in Texas during final phases of the American Civil War.
Battle of Riachuelo 11 June – Brazil defeats Paraguay
Battle of la Loma 16 July
Battle of Platte Bridge 26 July
Battle of Paso de Cuevas 12 August
Battle of Bone Pile Creek 13–15 August
Battle of Jataí or Yataí 17 August – The combined army of the Triple Alliance (Brazil, Argentina and Uruguay) attacks a Paraguayan column of troops in the Paraguayan War
Battle of the Tongue River 29 August – U.S. forces led by Patrick E. Connor defeat Arapaho forces.
Battle of Papudo 26 November – Peru and Chile defeat Spain in a naval battle.

1866–1900
 1866 –
Battle of Abtao 7 February – Indecisive battle between combined Peruvian-Chilean fleet and Spanish fleet.
 Battle of Callao 2 May – Spain defeats Peruvian forces.
 Battle of Tuyutí or Tuyuty 24 May – The combined army of the Triple Alliance (Brazil, Argentina and Uruguay) is attacked by Paraguayan Army in the swamp fields of Tuyuty (Paraguay). Almost 60,000 took part in the fight. 16,000 casualties (8,000 allied; 12,000 Paraguayans). Paraguayan War
 Battle of Ridgeway 2 June – Fenian Brotherhood defeats Canadians.
 Battle of Fort Erie 2 June – Canadian force overwhelmed by main Fenian army.
 Battle of Custoza (1866) 24 June
Battle of Langensalza 27 June – Hanoverian Army under King George V defeated by Prussians under General Flies Austro-Prussian War
Battle of Burkersdorf 28 June
 Battle of Skalitz 28 June
Battle of Königgrätz – (Sadowa) Prussia, led by General Helmuth von Moltke, defeats Austria in Austro-Prussian War, resulting in Prussia taking over as prominent German nation from Austria
Battle of Custoza – During Austro-Prussian War
Battle of Lissa 20 July – Austrian Admiral Wilhelm von Tegetthoff rams and drives off Italian fleet under Persano. First clash of ironclads.
Battle of Bezzecca 21 July – Garibaldi defeats Austrians.
 Battle of Tauberbischofsheim 24 July
Battle of Curuzú 1–3 September
Battle of Curupaity 22 September – Argentine and Brazilian forces of 20,000 men attack Paraguayan trenches on Curupaity. Paraguayan War.
Battle of Miahuatlán 3 October
Battle of La Carbonera 18 October
Battle of Owyhee River 26 December
 1867 –
Battle of Steen's Mountain 29 January
Battle of Kansala - 13 – 27 May. Forces of the Kaabu Empire fight those of The Imamate of Futa Jallon. Kaabu Defenders blow up Kansala once defeat is clear, taking many attackers with it.
Battle of Fandane-Thiouthioune 18 July – the Serer people defeated the Muslim jihadists of Senegambia (present-day Senegal and the Gambia).
Battle of Infernal Caverns 26–28 September
Battle of Potrero Obella 28 October
 1868 –
Pasoemah Expedition – Expedition of the Royal Netherlands East Indies Army to the Pasoemah (also Pasumah) region in South Sumatra. The expedition lasted from 1864 to 1868
Battle of Awa 28 January
Battle of Hokuetsu 29 March
Battle of Kōshū-Katsunuma 29 March
Battle of Magdala 9–13 April – Sir Robert Napier defeats the army of Emperor Tewodros II of Ethiopia and captures Magdala by assault. Tewodros commits suicide.
 Battle of Utsunomiya Castle 10–14 May
 Battle of Ueno 4 July
Battle of Piribebuy 12 August
Battle of Beecher Island 17–19 September
Battle of Bonari Pass 6 October
Battle of Noheji 7 November
Battle of Washita River 27 November – George Armstrong Custer defeats Black Kettle.
Battle of Itororó 6 December – First battle of a series fought the month of December between the Brazilian Army and the Paraguayan one. Around 13,000 Brazilians attack a fortified position on a river bridge, defended by 5,000 Paraguayans. Paraguayan War
Battle of Avahy or Avaí 11 December – 17,000 Allied troops, mainly Brazilians, attack 4,000 Paraguayans. Paraguayan War
Battle of Lomas Valentinas 21–27 December – Fought in two days between The Triple Alliance Army (Brazil, Argentina and Uruguay) against Paraguayan forces (19,500 allies on the first day; 25,000 on the second/ 6,500 Paraguayans). The end of the Paraguayan Army by death or captured. Paraguayan War
1870
Battle of Cerro Corá 1 March
 Battle of Eccles Hill 25 May – Canadians defeat Fenian Brotherhood.
Battle of Wissembourg 4 August – German victory during Franco-Prussian War.
Battle of Spicheren 6 August – Karl Friedrich von Steinmetz leads Prussians to victory over the French.
Battle of Woerth 6 August – German Crown Prince defeats French forces.
Battle of Mars-La-Tour 16 August – German strategic victory against French.
Battle of Gravelotte 18 August – German victory against French.
Battle of Sedan 1 September – Mac-Mahon's French lose to Germans, paving the way to the founding of the German Empire
Siege of Strasbourg ended 28 September – Germans capture city.
Battle of Le Bourget 27–30 September – Albert, King of Saxony defeats French forces.
Battle of Chevilly 30 September – French attack on Prussian forces repulsed.
Siege of Metz 19 August – 27 October – François Achille Bazaine forced to surrender.
Battle of Coulmiers (November 1870) – French army, under general Aurelles de Paladines, defeat a Bavarian army. Liberation of the city of Orléans.
Battle of Villiers 29 November – 3 December – Germans defeat French.
1871
 Battle of the Lisaine 15–17 January – French efforts to lift the Siege of Belfort fail.
 Battle of St. Quentin 19 January – Prussians defeat French.
 Battle of Buzenval 20 January – German Crown Prince defeats the French.
 Siege of Belfort ended 18 February – German victory during Franco-Prussian War.
 Battle of Adwa fought between Emperor Tekle Giyorgis II and Kassa Mercha. Kassa Mercha decisively defeats an army of some 60,000 under Tekle Giyorgis with 12,000 of his own troops, securing his path to become Yohannes IV, Emperor of Ethiopia.
 1873 –
First Battle of the Stronghold 17 January
 First Aceh Expedition 26 March – 25 April – Part of the Aceh War. An expedition under Major General Johan Harmen Rudolf Köhler. The intention of the Dutch was to attack and take the Sultan's palace.
Battle of Turret Peak 27 March
Battle of Honsinger Bluff 4 August
Battle of Pease Bottom 11 August
 1874 –
Second Battle of Adobe Walls 27 June – 28 hunters hold off 300 Comanche warriors.
 Battle of Palo Duro Canyon 28 September – Comanche, Cheyenne, and Kiowa defeated by United States forces.
Battle of Sunset Pass 1 November
 1875 -
 Battle of Gondet 14–16 November. A large force under Yohannes IV decisively defeat a much smaller force of Egyptians under the commanders Arakil Bey, Colonel Ahrendrup, and Count Zichy, brother of the contemporary ambassador to Constantinople. This was one of the earlier battles in which Shalaka Alula would distinguish himself fighting for the Ethiopians.
 1876 –
Battle of Gura 7–9 March – Emperor of Ethiopia Yohannes IV decisively defeats an Egyptian punitive attack.
 Battle of Powder River 17 March
 Battle of Prairie Dog Creek 9 June
Battle of the Rosebud 17 June – Sioux, Cheyenne and Arapahoe warriors under Crazy Horse, check U.S. forces under George Crook, forcing him to retreat into Wyoming, preventing him from uniting with Custer.
Battle of Little Big Horn 25 June – Sitting Bull, Crazy Horse of Sioux defeat Custer in Montana.
Battle of Vučji Do 18 July – The Montenegrin-Herzegovinian forces heavily defeated the Ottomans, and managed to capture two of their commanders.
Battle of Šumatovac in August – The outnumbered Serbian army, led by colonel Kosta Protić, won a tactical victory in this defensive battle against the Ottoman forces in Serbian-Ottoman War (1876–1877)
Battle of Fundina 2 August – Montenegro defeated much bigger Ottoman army near the village of Kuči.
 Battle of Cedar Creek 21 October
Dull Knife Fight 25 November – U.S. and Pawnee forces surprise and destroy the village of the last free Cheyennes, forcing them to seek shelter with Crazy Horse's people..
 1877
Battle of Slim Buttes 8 January – 2000 U.S. Cavalry and infantry forces destroy a small village under Oglala chief American horse, then repulse a relief attack of 500-600 Lakota under Crazy Horse.
Battle of Tabaruzaka 3–20 March
Battle of Yellow House Canyon 18 March
Battle of Little Muddy Creek 7–8 May
Battle of Kizil-Tepe 25 June – Ottoman victory during the Russo-Turkish War.
Battle of Cottonwood 3–5 July
Battle of the Clearwater 10 July – Chief Joseph of the Nez Perce defeated by Oliver Otis Howard of the United States.
Battle of Nikopol 16 July – Russian forces capture city.
First Battle of Shipka Pass 17–19 July – Joseph Gourko seizes pass from Suleiman Pasha.
Battle of the Big Hole 9 August – Minor U.S. victory over the Nez Perce, John Gibbon wounded.
Battle of Camas Creek 20 August
Second Battle of Shipka Pass 21–26 August – Ottomans unable to retake pass.
Battle of Lovcha 1–3 September – Mikhail Skobelev defeats Osman Pasha in Bulgaria.
Battle of Canyon Creek 13 September
Third Battle of Shipka Pass 13–17 September – Suleiman Pasha fails in a second Ottoman attempt to retake the pass.
Battle of Shiroyama 24 September
Battle of Bear Paw 30 September – 5 October – American victory forces Chief Joseph to surrender.
Battle of Gorni-Dubnik 24 October – Gourko captures fortress.
Battle of Kars 17 November – Russian forces capture city.
Siege of Plevna 20 July – 10 December – Russians, after reverses, defeat Ottomans
 1878 –
Fourth Battle of Shipka Pass 5–9 January – Russians defeat Ottomans.
 Battle of Philippopolis 17 January – Ottomans forced to retreat to Constantinople.
Battle of Ali Masjid 21 November – British victory and first battle of the Anglo-Afghan War.
Battle of Peiwar Kotal 28–29 November – British victory over Afghanistan.
 1879 –
Battle of Isandlwana 22 January – Zulu combined army annihilates British-led force, start of Anglo-Zulu War
 Battle of Rorke's Drift 22 January – A small, heavily outnumbered British force defeats the Zulus in one of Britain's finest hours.
 Battle of Intombe 12 March – Zulu army destroys small British force in an ambush
 Battle of Topáter 23 March – Chile defeats Bolivia during the War of the Pacific
 Battle of Hlobane 28 March – British suffer yet another disaster at Zulu hands on the mountain of Hlobane
 Battle of Kambula 29 March – Zulu Impi defeated in an attack on a British laager in Britain's first major victory in the war
 Battle of Gingindlovu 2 April – British defeat Zulu.
 Siege of Eshowe ended 3 April – British victory during Anglo-Zulu War.
 Battle of Chipana 12 April – Indecisive naval battle between Chile and Bolivia.
Battle of Kam Dakka 22 April – British victory in Anglo-Afghan War.
Battle of Iquique 21 May – Indecisive battle between Chile and the combined forces of Peru and Bolivia.
Battle of Ulundi 4 July – Decisive British victory at Zulu capital, end of Anglo-Zulu War
Naval Battle of Angamos 8 October – Chilean navy defeats the navies of Peru and Bolivia.
Battle of Pisagua 2 November – Successful Chilean amphibious assault.
Battle of San Francisco 19 November – Peruvian and Bolivian troops ambush Chileans, but Bolivians retreat, forcing Peruvians to follow suit.
Battle of Tarapacá 27 November – Peru defeats Chile.
Battle of Novšiće 4 December – Pro-Ottoman irregular troops of the League of Prizren ambushed and repulsed Montenegrin forces.
First Battle of Charasiab - British victory
 1880 –
Battle of Murino 8 January - around 10,000 pro-Ottoman forces attacked and were repulsed by Montenegrins numbering 3,000.
Battle of Hembrillo Basin 5–8 April
Battle of Ahmed Khel 19 April – British and Indian forces defeat Afghans.
Battle of Fort Tularosa 14 May
Battle of Arica 2 July – Chile storms Peruvian positions atop a hill.  Heavy casualties including Peruvian commander and several Chilean officers.
Second Aceh Expedition – Dutch Colonial forces take the sultan's palace in Aceh.
Battle of Maiwand 27 July – Afghan victory over British and Indian forces.
Battle of Carrizo Canyon 12 September
Battle of Kandahar 1 September – British victory over Afghan forces, following General Roberts' Kabul to Kandahar relief march.
Battle of Bronkhorstspruit 20 December – Transvaal Boers defeat British.
Second Battle of Charasiab - Brits recapture Char Asiab
 1881 –
Battle of Laing's Nek 28 January – Boer victory, British gunfire holds Boers back long enough to allow retreat.
 Battle of Schuinshoogte 8 February – Rain stops the battle before British reinforcements arrive, Boer victory.
 Battle of Majuba Hill 27 February – Boer victory over British, George Pomeroy Colley killed.
Battle of Cibecue Creek 30 August
 1882 –
Battle of Embabo 6 June – Shewan forces under Negus Menelik II defeat the opposing forces of Gojjam under Negus Tekle Haymanot, giving Shewa the hegemony over the Gibe region and making Menelik the most powerful ruler in Ethiopia except for Emperor Yohannes IV
Battle of Big Dry Wash 17 July
Battle of Tel al-Kebir 13 September – British forces defeat Egyptian army under Colonel Urabi.
 1883 –
 Battle of Cầu Giấy 19 May – Black Flag forces defeated French forces in Tonkin.
 Battle of El Obeid – Mahdi wipes out Egyptians controlling Sudan
 Continuing war – Third part of the Aceh War. Major J.B. van Heutsz, conquered the rest of Aceh, and became Governor of the Dutch East Indies.
 1884 –
 Battles of El Teb 4–29 February – Mahdi forces battle Egyptian then British forces.
 Battle of Tamai 13 March – British forces under Sir Gerald Graham defeat a Mahdi army under Osman Digna, despite the successful breaking of an infantry square.
 Battle of Fuzhou 23 August – French fleet destroyed Qing Chinese fleet at Foochow.
 Battle of Tamsui 2–8 October – Chinese victory over the French in Taiwan.
 Battle of Yu Oc 19 November - French victory over Black Flag forces in Tonkin.
 Siege of Tuyên Quang 24 November 1884 – 3 March 1885 – French victory in Tonkin.
 1885 –
 Battle of Nui Bop 4 January - French victory over Qing Chinese forces in Tonkin.
Battle of Khartoum – After a 10-month siege, on 26 January the Mahdi capture the city from the British, slaughtering the garrison and its commander, Chinese Gordon, as well as 4,000 inhabitants.
 Battle of Đồng Đăng 23 February - French victory over Qing Chinese forces at the Chinese border.
 Battle of Hòa Mộc 2 March – French victory over Qing Chinese and Black Flag forces in Tonkin.
 Battle of Bang Bo 23–24 March – Chinese victory over French forces in Tonkin.
 Battle of Phu Lam Tao 23 March – Qing Chinese and Black Flag victory over French forces in Tonkin.
 Battle of Duck Lake 26 March – Gabriel Dumont wins a victory for the Métis people during the North-West Rebellion in Saskatchewan.
 Battle of Fort Pitt 2–15 April – Cree forces destroy Canadian fort.
 Battle of Fish Creek 24 April – Frederick Middleton withdraws the Canadian force from what could have been a victory over the Métis.
 Battle of Cut Knife 2 May – Cree and Assiniboine defeat Canadian force
 Battle of Batoche 5–12 May – Middleton defeats Dumont.
Battle of Devil's Creek 22 May
Battle of Frenchman's Butte 28 May – Cree withstand Canadian assault.
Battle of Loon Lake 3 June – Canadian Dominion defeats the Cree.
Battle of Kufit 23 September – Ras Alula defeats an invading Mahdi army led by Osman Digna.
Battle of Slivnitsa 5–7 November (OS) – Bulgarians win the decisive engagement of the Serbo-Bulgarian War
Battle of Pirot 14–15 November (OS) – Last battle of the Serbo-Bulgarian War.
Battle of Little Dry Creek 19 December
Battle of Ginnis 30 December – Anglo-Egyptian Army defeat Mahdist Sudanese warriors of Dervish Empire, effectively ending First Sudan Campaign.
 1886 –
 Battle of Azule - Ras Darge Sahle Selassie defeats a force of Arsi Oromo while on campaign in their lands. In the following months, he will annex their country into some type of emergent Shewan 'Empire'.
 1887 –
 Battle of Chelenqo 9 January – Negus Menelik II routs the tiny Harari army of emir 'Abd-Allah II, leading to the conquest of Harar.
 Battle of Dogali 24 January – Ras Alula annihilates an Italian battalion sent to relieve an Ethiopian siege of Sahati.
 1888 –
 Battle of Suakin 20 December – British defeated the Mahdi forces near Suakin
 1889 – 
 Battle of Gallabat 9–10 March – At the moment his army is about to crush the Mahdi army, Emperor Yohannes IV is killed, and his army defeated.
 1890 –
 Battle of Atchoukpa 20 April - French forces defeat the Dahomean army near Porto-Novo
 Battle of Wounded Knee 29 December – Sioux crushed in last Indian Wars battle
 1891 –
Battle of Mulayda 24 January – Rashidi troops ended the Second Saudi State.
 Battle of Pozo Almonte 6 March
 Battle of Concón 21 August
 Battle of Placilla 28 August
 1893 
 Battle of Bembesi 1 November – 700 British troops defeat 10,000 Ndebele during First Matabele War
 Battle of Uruzgan - Expulsion of Uruzgani Hazaras
 1894 Battle of Yalu River 17 September – Japanese fleet barely defeats Chinese off Korea
 1895 –
Battle of Coatit 13–14 January – After occupying Adwa, the Italians defeat a counterattack by Ras Mangesha Yohannes.
 Battle of Keelung (1895) 2–3 June
 Battle of Baguashan 27 August
 Battle of Yunlin-Chiayi 1–2 September
 Battle of Ciayi 9 October
 Battle of Chiatung 11 October
 Battle of Changhsing 26 November
Battle of Amba Alagi 7 December – Ras Makonnen Woldemikael leads the first Ethiopian counterstrike of the First Italo-Abyssinian War to success.
 1896 –
Siege of Mek'ele 6–21 January – The forces of Menelik II besiege the Italians at Mek'ele, until the defenders receive permission allowing them to leave the town.
 Battle of Adowa 1 March – Ethiopian soldiers under Emperor Menelik II deal a humiliating defeat upon Italian troops.
 Battle of Camalig 2 April
 Battle of Calamba May
 Battle of Tres de Abril 3–8 April
 Battle of San Juan del Monte 30 August
 Battle of Novelta 30 August
 Battle of San Francisco de Malabon 31 August
 Battle of Talisay 12 October
 Battle of Batangas 23 October
Battle of Binakayan-Dalahican 9–11 November – The first major victory of the Philippine Revolutionary soldiers over Spanish colonial forces under General Emilio Aguinaldo, Lieutenant General Edilberto Evangelista, General Candido Tirona and Gregoria Montoya y Patricio, in the vicinity of Cavite el Viejo town, now Kawit, Cavite.
 Battle of Sambat 15–16 November
 1897 
 Battle of Dömeke – Ottoman victory during Greco-Turkish war on Creten conflict
Battle of Zapote Bridge 17 February – The victory of the Philippine Revolutionary forces by General Emilio Aguinaldo and General Edilberto Evangelista, captured Zapote Bridge in Bacoor, Cavite and defeated the Spanish colonial forces under Governor-General Camilo de Polavieja.
 Battle of Saragarhi 12 September – Between twenty-one Sikhs of the 4th Battalion (then 36th Sikhs) of the Sikh Regiment of British India, defending an army post, and 10,000 Afghan.
 1898 –
Battle of Manila Bay 1 May – Dewey says "You may fire when you are ready Gridley"
 Battle of Cárdenas 11 May – Spanish naval victory near Cuba.
Battle of Cienfuegos 11 May – U.S. forces cut two telegraph cables, but fail to destroy a third due to Spanish intervention.
Battle of San Juan 12 May – Indecisive battle in Puerto Rico.
 Battle of Alapan 28 May
Invasion of Guantánamo Bay (6–10 June) – United States commences its invasion of Cuba during the Spanish–American War.
Battle of Guam 20–21 June – U.S. forces capture island, Spanish governor protests since he was unaware of the Declaration of War.
Battle of Las Guasimas 24 June – First major land battle of Spanish–American War.
Battle of Tayacoba 30 June – U.S. forces barely able to rescue trapped reconnaissance force.
Battle of El Caney 1 July – Spanish forces hold back Americans.
Battle of San Juan Hill 1 July – Theodore Roosevelt storms the hill, U.S. victory.
Battle of Santiago de Cuba 3 July – Admiral Cervera's Spanish fleet destroyed trying to escape blockading US Fleet and reach reinforcements
Siege of Santiago 3–18 July – American forces capture city, but the outbreak of disease begins to take its toll on the Americans.
Battle of Rio Manimani 23 July – Unsuccessful American landing attempt in Cuba.
Battle of Yauco 26 July – American victory despite desertions.
Battle of Guayama 5 August – American push past Spanish snipers to take town.
Battle of Guamani 9 August – United States victory in Puerto Rico.
Battle of Coamo 9 August – Americans troops destroy the Spanish garrison at Coamo, Puerto Rico
Battle of Silva Heights 10 August – Spanish forces retreat after American attack with cannons and gatling guns.
Battle of Abonito Pass 12 August – Battle interrupted by news of armistice.
Battle of Manila (Spanish–American War) (25 July – 15 August) – U.S. and Filipino forces capture Philippine capital from Spanish.
Battle of Omdurman 2 September – British under Kitchener ambushed by Sudanese dervishes
 1899 –
Battle of Manila (Philippine–American War) 4–5 February – American troops engage with the Philippine Army in the first battle of the Philippine–American War. After hard fighting, the Americans rout the Filipinos.
First Battle of Caloocan 10 February – American victory during Philippine–American War.
Second Battle of Caloocan 22–24 February – American victory during Philippine–American War.
Battle of Balantang 10 March
Battle of Marilao River 27 March – American victory during the Philippine–American War.
Battle of Santa Cruz 9–10 April – American victory during Philippine–American War.
Battle of Pagsanjan 11 April – Philippine forces routed by American sharpshooters and artillery.
Battle of Paete 12 April – Americans under Henry W. Lawton defeat small Philippine force.
Battle of Quingua 23 April – Battle during the Philippine-American War.
Battle of Calumpit 25–27 April – American victory during Philippine-American War.
Battle of Zapote River 13 June – American victory during Philippine-American War.
Battle of Olongapo 18–23 September – American victory during the Philippine-American War.
Battle of Kraaipan 12 October
Battle of Senluo Temple 18 October
Battle of Talana Hill 20 October – British Pyrrhic victory over the Boers.
Battle of Elandslaagte 21 October – Successful British cavalry charge in bad weather.
Battle of a Thousand Days in Colombia 24 October – Liberals vs. Conservatives, successful Colombia lost Panamá (24 October 1899 – 24 October 1902).
Battle of Ladysmith 30 October
Battle of San Jacinto 11 November – American forces defeat Philippine army under General Tinio.
Battle of Belmont (1899) 23 November
Battle of Modder River 28 November – British defeat Boers under Piet Cronjé.
Battle of Tirad Pass 2 December – Filipino Forces
Battle of Stormberg 10 December – Boer victory during Second Boer War.
Battle of Magersfontein 11 December – Piet Cronjé defeats British forces.
Battle of Colenso 15 December – British forces attacked while caught in a loop of a river, heavy casualties.
Battle of Paye 19 December – Filipino forces initially defeat American forces but are later defeated.
 1900 –
Battle of Spion Kop 24 January – Boer victory
Battle of Vaal Krantz 5–7 February
Battle of Paardeberg 18–27 February – British capture forces of Boer general Piet Cronjé
 Battle of Poplar Grove 7 March
 Battle of Boshof 5 April
 Battle of Cagayan de Misamis 7 April
 Battle of Agusan Hill 14 May 
 Battle of Makahambus Hill 4 June
Battle of Diamond Hill 11–12 June – British empire forces defeat Boers
Battle of Witpoort 16 July
Battle of Calidonia Bridge 24–26 July
Battle of Elands River (1900) 4–16 August – August Australian and Rhodesian force's defeat Boers
Battle of Beicang 5 August
Battle of Yangcun 6 August
Battle of Mabitac 17 September
Battle of Beitang 20 September

Siege of Ladysmith 2 November – 28 February – Unsuccessful Boer siege.
Battle of Sanna's Post 31 March – British forces caught in double-pronged Boer ambush.
Siege of Mafeking 13 October 1899 – 17 May – British forces withstand Boer siege.
Battle of Pulang Lupa 13 September – Filipino guerrillas ambush and defeat a U.S. infantry column during the Philippine–American War.
Battle of Mabitac 17 September – Filipino soldiers under General Juan Cailles outmaneuver the 37th and 15th U.S. Volunteer Infantry during the Philippine–American War.
Battle of Bothaville 6 November
Battle of Leliefontein 7 November
Battle of Nooitgedacht 13 December

See also
 List of Napoleonic Battles 
 Battles of the American Civil War

References

19th-century conflicts
Lists of battles by date